= Publication of Darwin's theory =

Publication of theory of natural selection

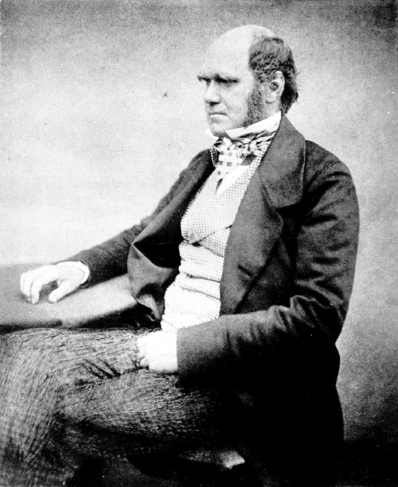
Darwin, as photographed in 1860, was still clean shaven at this time.

Charles Darwin formally presented his theory of evolution by natural selection in 1858, but it was fully published and explained in his book On the Origin of Species, released on 24 November 1859.

Thoughts on the possibility of transmutation of species which he recorded in 1836 towards the end of his five-year voyage on the Beagle were followed on his return by findings and work which led him to conceive of his theory in September 1838. He gave priority to his career as a geologist whose observations and theories supported Charles Lyell's uniformitarian ideas, and to publication of the findings from the voyage as well as his journal of the voyage, but he discussed his evolutionary ideas with several naturalists and carried out extensive research on his "hobby" of evolutionary work.

He was writing up his theory in 1858 when he received an essay from Alfred Russel Wallace who was in Borneo, describing Wallace's own theory of natural selection, prompting immediate joint publication of extracts from Darwin's 1844 essay together with Wallace's paper as On the Tendency of Species to form Varieties; and on the Perpetuation of Varieties and Species by Natural Means of Selection in a presentation to the Linnaean Society on 1 July 1858. This attracted little notice, but spurred Darwin to write an "abstract" of his work which was published in 1859 as his book On the Origin of Species.

== Background ==
Darwin's ideas developed rapidly from the return in 1836 of the Beagle survey expedition. By December 1838 he had developed the principles of his theory. At that time similar ideas brought others disgrace and association with the revolutionary mob. He was conscious of the need to answer all likely objections before publishing. While he continued with research as his "prime hobby", his priority was an immense amount of work on geology and analysing and publishing findings from the Beagle expedition. This was repeatedly delayed by illness.

Natural history at that time was dominated by clerical naturalists whose income came from the Established Church of England and who saw the science of the day as revealing God's plan. Darwin found three close allies: Charles Lyell, Joseph Dalton Hooker and Thomas Huxley. Books by the eminent geologist Charles Lyell had influenced the young Darwin during the voyage, and he then befriended Darwin who he saw as a supporter of his ideas of gradual geological processes with continuing divine Creation of species. By the 1840s Darwin became friends with the young botanist Joseph Dalton Hooker, who had followed his father into that science, and after going on a survey voyage used his contacts to eventually find a position. In the 1850s Darwin met Thomas Huxley, an ambitious naturalist who had returned from a long survey trip but lacked the family wealth or contacts to find a career and who joined the progressive group around Herbert Spencer fighting to make science a profession, freed from the clerics.

Darwin made attempts to open discussions about his theory with his close scientific colleagues. In January 1842 Darwin sent a tentative description of his ideas in a letter to Lyell, then prepared a "Pencil Sketch" of his theory. He worked up his "Sketch" into an "Essay" in 1844, and eventually persuaded Hooker to read a copy in January 1847. His geology books and publication of Beagle findings were completed in 1846, when he began what became eight years of research into classification of barnacle species, exploring the immense amount of variation in nature.

In September 1854 Darwin had the last of his barnacle monographs ready for publication, and he turned his attention fully to questions about how species originated. He freely discussed his intention to write a book on the subject, and planned avenues of research with other scientists. He went over his previous notes and writings on the topic, and drew up proposals for investigations and research into the implications of his theory. One topic was explaining geographical distribution of organisms; he got information from international correspondence, and experimented on the viability of methods of dispersal. He widened his investigations into variability in nature, and experimented on plant hybridisation and cross-fertilisation.

Variation under domestication became a major topic of research: in 1855 he began to develop a web of contacts, both in the UK and worldwide, to get information on the origins and variation of domesticated animals, particularly poultry, ducks, rabbits, and pigeons. He got extensive information, specimens and ideas from Edward Blyth in India, who put him in contact with Edgar Leopold Layard in South Africa. At the suggestion of William Yarrell, Darwin began pigeon breeding at Down House to investigate varieties of domestic pigeons, and gained access to the expertise of William Bernhard Tegetmeier who was glad to research aspects of interest to Darwin. From March, he also got information and specimens from his relative William Darwin Fox who bred poultry and ducks at his rectory in the parish of Delamere, Cheshire.

In 1856 he was gradually bringing his friends round towards accepting evolution as a process, but was far from convincing them about the mechanism, when Wallace's entry into the discussion brought a new urgency to publication.

== Wallace ==
Alfred Russel Wallace, a naturalist working as a specimen collector in Borneo, spent Christmas 1854 visiting Sir James Brooke, the White Rajah of Sarawak, then during the ensuing rainy season lived alone in a little Dayak house, with only one Malay servant as cook. He recalled, "during the evening and wet days, I had nothing to do but look over my books". He had already read Lyell's Principles of Geology which opposed Lamarck by arguing that the fossil record showed no progress. Wallace had also read the 1845 second edition of Darwin's Journal of Researches which hinted at evolution by describing the "wonderful relationship in the same continent" between fossil and extant species, which would "throw more light on the appearance of organic beings on our earth, and their disappearance from it, than any other class of facts". In it, Darwin had described how species unique to the Galápagos Islands "all show a marked relationship with those of America" despite its distance.

Wallace had also been impressed by Pictet's studies of palaeontology, and was now annoyed by a recent article by Edward Forbes which dismissed evolutionary ideas and instead proposed that species were created in a pattern showing a divine plan of polarity. In February, Wallace completed his paper "On the Law which has Regulated the Introduction of New Species" which was published in September 1855 in the Annals and Magazine of Natural History.

This "Sarawak paper" countered Forbes, and showed Wallace's opinions. He incorporated points from Lyell, Darwin, Pictet and others, including Vestiges of the Natural History of Creation. It combined these with Wallace's own observations to support his conclusion that "Every species has come into existence coincident both in space and time with a closely allied species". This was a theory of a succession of species, but referred to "creation" rather than explicitly proposing an evolutionary mechanism [in 1905 Wallace recalled that he left descent to be inferred]. Brooke read it as either a series of creations or one species growing into another, and in 1856 told Wallace he had no objection to the latter. Wallace had told him that the paper was to "feel the pulse of scientific men" about the hypothesis, and Brooke was indignant at the suggestion that "bigotry & intolerance" would be aroused by novel views: this would explain Wallace's ambiguity. Lyell's resistance to Darwin's evolutionary ideas was shaken by the paper; in November 1855 Lyell began writing species notebooks, starting with a note about Wallace. On 8 December Edward Blyth wrote from Calcutta to ask Darwin for his views on the paper. Blyth thought it "Good! Upon the whole!" and said "according to his theory, the various domestic races of animals have been fairly developed into species". It is not known when Darwin read this letter.

During December 1855, Darwin extended his research into variation under domestication with letters to nearly 30 people around the world, requesting their help in obtaining specimens of "Any domestic breed or race, of Poultry, Pigeons, Rabbits, Cats, & even dogs, if not too large, which has been bred for many generations in any little visited region." As Blyth had suggested earlier, Darwin wrote on 9 December to Edgar Leopold Layard in South Africa, and said that he was "collecting all the facts & reasoning which I could, in regard to the variation & origin of species", particularly pigeons. On 24 December Darwin wrote to the diplomat Sir Charles Murray in Persia, similarly saying he had "for many years been working on the perplexed subject of the origin of varieties & species, & for this purpose I am endeavouring to study the effects of domestication". Letters also went to Brooke, and to Wallace via his agent Samuel Stevens. In August 1856 Wallace told Stevens that specimens for Darwin were included in a shipment. In November Darwin wrote to tell William Bernhardt Tegetmeier that a box of Persian poultry specimens from Murray had arrived, and "Mr Wallace is collecting in the Malay Archipelago".

Wallace's "Sarawak paper" was included in the July–December 1855 volume of the Annals and Magazine of Natural History. Darwin jotted comments in his copy of this volume: "Laws of Geograph. Distrib. nothing very new", and "Uses my simile of tree— It seems all creation with him", but "he puts the facts in striking point of view". He noted Wallace's point that geological knowledge was imperfect, and commented "put generation for creation & I quite agree". (two years later, Darwin still thought Wallace was proposing creation).

== "Natural Selection" ==
When Lyell and his wife visited the Darwins at Downe from 13 to 16 April 1856, Darwin explained his theory to Lyell, who then wrote up notes headed "With Darwin: On the Formation of Species by Natural Selection", with pigeons as one example. At another Down House party on 26–27 April, Darwin had long discussions with his guests Joseph Dalton Hooker, Thomas Henry Huxley, and Thomas Vernon Wollaston. Lyell subsequently heard that they "ran a tilt against species farther I believe than they are deliberately prepared to go. ... I cannot easily see how they can go so far, and not embrace the whole Lamarckian doctrine."

On 1 May Lyell wrote to urge Darwin to establish priority: "I wish you would publish some small fragment of your data pigeons if you please & so out with the theory & let it take date—& be cited—& understood." Darwin replied on 3 May: "With respect to your suggestion of a sketch of my view; I hardly know what to think, but will reflect on it; but it goes against my prejudices. To give a fair sketch would be absolutely impossible, for every proposition requires such an array of facts. If I were to do anything it could only refer to the main agency of change, selection,—& perhaps point out a very few of the leading features which countenance such a view, & some few of the main difficulties. But I do not know what to think: I rather hate the idea of writing for priority, yet I certainly sh^{d} be vexed if any one were to publish my doctrines before me."

On Thursday 8 May, while in London for meetings, Darwin visited Lyell. In a letter to Hooker the next day, Darwin said he "had good talk with Lyell about my species work, & he urges me strongly to publish something. I am fixed against any periodical or Journal, as I positively will not expose myself to an Editor or Council allowing a publication for which they might be abused". If he published, it could only be "a very thin & little volume, giving a sketch of my views & difficulties; but it is really dreadfully unphilosophical to give a resumé, without exact references, of an unpublished work". Lyell appeared to think it could be done "at the suggestion of friends" as Darwin had "been at work for 18 years, & yet could not publish for several years". Hooker's response encouraging publication was welcomed by Darwin, who thought his suggestion "that the Essay might supersede & take away all novelty & value from my future larger Book, is very true; & that would grieve me beyond everything. On the other hand, (again from Lyell's urgent advice) I published a preliminary sketch of Coral Theory & this did neither good nor harm.— I begin most heartily to wish that Lyell had never put this idea of an Essay into my head." On 14 May 1856 Darwin noted in his journal that he had begun his "species sketch".

By July, Darwin had decided to produce Natural Selection as a full technical treatise on species. Lyell seemed to be coming round to Darwin's ideas, but in private was agonising over the social implications if humans had animal ancestry, particularly now that race was becoming an issue, with Robert Knox describing races as different species and warning of racial wars. Hooker's verdict on the growing manuscript was "incomparably more favourable" than Darwin had anticipated, while Darwin tried to put over the point that "external conditions do extremely little", it was the selection of "chance" variations that produced new species.

Darwin's experiments on how species spread were now extended to considering how animals such as snails could be carried on birds' feet, and seeds in birds' droppings. His tenth child, Charles Waring Darwin was born on 6 December apparently without his full share of intelligence, renewing fears of inbreeding and hereditary defects, a topic that he covered in principle in his book.

Darwin's cousin William Darwin Fox continued to give him strong support, warning him against overworking on his huge book and recommending a holiday, but Darwin was immersed in his experiments and his writing. "I am got most deeply interested in my subject; though I wish I could set less value on the bauble fame, either present or posthumous, than I do, but not, I think, to any extreme degree; yet, if I know myself, I would work just as hard, though with less gusto, if I knew that my Book w^{d} be published for ever anonymously".

On 23 February 1857 the Darwins were visited for lunch by Robert FitzRoy, who had been the captain of HMS Beagle during Darwin's voyage, together with his second wife, his first wife and his only daughter having died.

=== Struggle for existence ===
Alfred Tennyson wrote his great poem "In Memoriam A.H.H." which introduced the phrase "Nature, red in tooth and claw", and Darwin worked on The Struggle for Existence. A discussion with Thomas Huxley on how jellyfish might cross-fertilise got the witty response that "the indecency of the process is to a certain extent in favour of its probability". In July 1856 Darwin passed Huxley's remark on to Hooker with the comment, "What a book a Devil's chaplain might write on the clumsy, wasteful, blundering low & horridly cruel works of nature!", apparently a reference to the nickname given to the Radical Revd. Robert Taylor who had visited Cambridge on an "infidel home missionary tour" when Darwin was a student there (though the term goes back to Chaucer's Parson's Tale).

Darwin pressed on with writing his "big book" on Natural Selection, overworking, until in March 1857 illness began cutting his working day "ridiculously short". Eventually, he took a fortnight's water treatment at the nearby Moor Park spa run by Edward Lane, and this revived him.

Wallace had been collecting for Darwin, sending domestic fowl specimens from Indonesia, and a letter he had written in October reached Darwin at the spa. On 1 May Darwin replied, agreeing with Wallace's 1855 paper "On the Law which has Regulated the Introduction of New Species": "I can see that we have thought much alike & to a certain extent have come to similar conclusions. ... This summer will make the 20th year (!) since I opened my first-note-book, on the question how & in what way do species & varieties differ from each other.— I am now preparing my work for publication, but I find the subject so very large, that though I have written many chapters, I do not suppose I shall go to press for two years." He agreed with Wallace that "climatal conditions" had little effect, and wrote "It is really impossible to explain my views in the compass of a letter on the causes & means of variation in a state of nature; but I have slowly adopted a distinct & tangible idea.— Whether true or false others must judge".

Darwin returned home in early May, but a cold and social pressure set him back. He had to return to the spa, finishing "variation" in July and posting pages to Huxley for checking.

Working class militants were seizing on the popularity of gorillas (which were now appearing in travelling menageries) to trumpet man's monkey origins. To crush these ideas, Richard Owen as President-elect of the Royal Association announced his authoritative anatomical studies of primate brains showing that humans were not just a separate species, but a separate sub-class. In July 1857, Darwin commented to Hooker, "Owen's is a grand Paper; but I cannot swallow Man making a division as distinct from a Chimpanzee, as an ornithorhynchus from a Horse: I wonder what a Chimpanzee wd. say to this?".

=== Asa Gray and the young guard ===
Others helped with providing information, including Asa Gray on American plants. Darwin wrote to Gray on 20 July 1857 saying that after 19 years of work on the question of whether species "have descended from other species, like varieties from one species" and "that species arise like our domestic varieties with much extinction", he had "come to the heteredox conclusion that there are no such things as independently created species – that species are only strongly defined varieties. I know that this will make you despise me. – I do not much underrate the many huge difficulties on this view, but yet it seems to me to explain too much, otherwise inexplicable, to be false." An intrigued Gray admitted to his own notion that there was some law or power inherent in plants making varieties appear, and asked if Darwin was finding this law. Realising that Gray had not grasped what he was suggesting, Darwin sent him a letter on 5 September outlining the difficulties involved. He enclosed a brief but detailed abstract of his ideas on natural selection and divergence, copied out by the schoolmaster to make it more legible.

Gray responded, questioning his use of the term "natural selection" as an agent. In his reply Darwin said that he had to use this shorthand to save incessantly having to expand it into a formula such as "the tendency to the preservation (owing to the severe struggle for life to which all organic beings at some time or generation are exposed) of any the slightest variation in any part, which is of the slightest use or favourable to the life of the individual which has thus varied; together with the tendency to its inheritance". He asked Gray to maintain secrecy. The young guard of naturalists were now putting the "mode of creation" openly on the agenda, even in addresses to the Geological Society, but Darwin wanted his case to be fully prepared.

Joseph Dalton Hooker, John Tyndall and Thomas Huxley now formed a group of young naturalists holding Darwin in high regard, basing themselves in the Linnean Society of London which had just moved to Burlington House, Piccadilly, London, near the Royal Society. Huxley had not yet understood natural selection despite Darwin's hints about pedigree and genealogical trees. Huxley's attention was focussed on defeating the dominant orthodoxy of the arrogant Owen.

== The country squire ==
Darwin's attention turned from pigeons to seedlings, experimenting with subjecting plants to conditions which might produce variation. His family helped with this and with tracking bees, experimenting (unsuccessfully) to try to find out what would influence their flight path.

His wife Emma Darwin was now known throughout the parish for helping in the way a parson's wife might be expected to, and as well as providing nursing care for her own family's frequent illnesses, she gave out bread tokens to the hungry and "small pensions for the old, dainties for the ailing, and medical comforts and simple medicine" based on Robert Darwin's old prescription book. Charles Darwin also took on local duties, increasing his social standing by becoming a Justice of the Peace and a magistrate. To accommodate the needs of his large family and accommodate visiting cousins further house extensions got under way. In November 1857 he escaped the worries for a week's recuperation at Lane's Moor Park spa.

== Human origins, Wallace encouraged ==
During his research in 1856, Darwin noted his intention to publish his views on human racial ancestry: by early September of that year while drafting his book on Natural Selection he began collecting notes for Chapter 6 on the topic of sexual selection. This would cover humans as well as birds and fishes. By 31 March 1857 he had drafted five chapters with the sixth under way, and he wrote out a table of contents. In the following months he completed ten pages of Chapter 6, some 2,500 words, and pencilled in the heading "Theory applied to Races of Man". At this stage he regarded sexual selection as due to a "struggle for supremacy" between males, and did not yet think of female choice as significant. He then apparently dropped the whole topic for some reason, possibly Charles Lyell's caution: the brief abstract Darwin sent to Asa Gray on 5 September made no mention of sexual selection or human evolution.

Wallace, responding to Darwin's 1 May letter, discussed his own theorising. Darwin replied on 22 December that he was "extremely glad to hear that you are attending to distribution in accordance with theoretical ideas. I am a firm believer, that without speculation there is no good & original observation", and added that "I believe I go much further than you; but it is too long a subject to enter on my speculative notions." He also said "You ask whether I shall discuss 'man';—I think I shall avoid whole subject, as so surrounded with prejudices, though I fully admit that it is the highest & most interesting problem for the naturalist."

Huxley used his March 1858 Royal Institution lecture to claim that structurally gorillas are as close to humans as they are to baboons. He added "Nay more I believe that the mental & moral faculties are essentially & fundamentally the same kind in animals & ourselves". This was a clear challenge to Owen's lecture claiming human uniqueness, given at the same venue. In a subsequent lecture Huxley stated that if there was a solution to the problem of species, it "must come from the side of indefinite modifiability", an indication that he was moving towards Darwin's position. In June he used his lecture at the Royal Society to attack Owen's "etherial archetype". Having gained a foothold in science with the aid of the Westminster Review group led by John Chapman and Herbert Spencer, Huxley was out to dislodge the domination of science by wealthy clergymen– led by Owen– instead wanting to create a professional salaried scientific civil service. To Spencer, animal species had developed by "adaptions upon adaptions". Huxley was using arguments on origins to split science from theology, arguing that "it is as respectable to be modified monkey as modified dirt".

=== Forestalled ===
Darwin was throwing himself into his work and his "big book" on Natural Selection was well under way, when on 18 June 1858 he received a parcel from Wallace. It enclosed about twenty pages describing an evolutionary mechanism with a request to send it on to Lyell. Shocked that he had been "forestalled", Darwin sent it on that day to Lyell, as requested by Wallace, with a letter:

Some year or so ago you recommended me to read a paper by Wallace in the 'Annals,' which had interested you, and, as I was writing to him, I knew this would please him much, so I told him. He has to-day sent me the enclosed, and asked me to forward it to you. It seems to me well worth reading. Your words have come true with a vengeance–that I should be forestalled. You said this, when I explained to you here very briefly my views of 'Natural Selection' depending on the struggle for existence. I never saw a more striking coincidence; if Wallace had my MS. sketch written out in 1842, he could not have made a better short abstract! Even his terms now stand as heads of my chapters. Please return me the MS., which he does not say he wishes me to publish, but I shall, of course, at once write and offer to send to any journal. So all my originality, whatever it may amount to, will be smashed, though my book, if it will ever have any value, will not be deteriorated; as all the labour consists in the application of the theory.
I hope you will approve of Wallace's sketch, that I may tell him what you say.

There were differences, though these were not evident to Darwin on reading the paper. Wallace's idea of selection was the environment eliminating the unfit rather than cut-throat competition among individuals, and he took an egalitarian view of the Dayak natives he was among, while Darwin had seen the Fuegians as backwards savages, albeit capable of improvement.

It had come at a bad time, as his favourite retreat at Moor Spa was threatened by Lane being put on trial accused of adultery, and five days later Darwin's baby Charles Waring came down with scarlet fever. Darwin's first impression had been that though it meant losing priority, it would be dishonourable for him to be "induced to publish from privately knowing that Wallace is in the field", but Lyell quickly responded strongly urging him to reconsider. Darwin's reply of 25 June was a plea for advice, noting that the points in Wallace's sketch had been fully covered in his own Essay of 1844 which Hooker had read in 1847, and that he had also set out his ideas in a letter to Asa Gray in 1857, "so that I could most truly say and prove that I take nothing from Wallace. I should be extremely glad now to publish a sketch of my general views in about a dozen pages or so. But I cannot persuade myself that I can do so honourably... I would far rather burn my whole book than that he or any man should think that I had behaved in a paltry spirit". He added a request that Hooker be informed to give a second opinion.

Darwin was overwrought when baby Charles Waring Darwin died on 28 June, and the next day acknowledged Hooker's letters saying "I cannot think now on the subject, but soon will." That night he read the letters, and to meet Hooker's request, though "quite prostrated", got his servant to deliver Wallace's essay, the letter to Asa Gray and "my sketch of 1844 solely that you may see by your own handwriting that you did read it". He left matters in the hands of Lyell and Hooker, writing "Do not waste much time. It is miserable in me to care at all about priority."

== Publication of joint paper ==
Lyell and Hooker agreed on a joint paper to be presented at the Linnean Society – Lyell, Hooker and Darwin were all fellows of the society and council members, and Hooker had been closely involved in reviving the fortunes of the society and running its journal. Other venues were either inappropriate, or in the case of the Zoological Society of London, potentially hostile under the leadership of Richard Owen. It was now time for the summer break but, as they knew, its meeting had been postponed due to the death of former president Robert Brown on 10 June 1858, and the council had arranged an extra meeting on 1 July.

At the last minute, late in the evening of 30 June, Lyell and Hooker forwarded the Wallace and Darwin papers to the Secretary John Joseph Bennett, to be read at the meeting the next day. Mrs. Hooker had spent the afternoon copying out extracts from the handwritten documents Darwin had sent with his letter of the previous night, presumably chosen by Hooker to suit the verbal presentation, and Lyell and Hooker wrote a short introductory letter. The papers entitled respectively On the Tendency of Species to form Varieties; and on the Perpetuation of Varieties and Species by Natural Means of Selection, incorporated Wallace's pages; and extracts from Darwin's 1844 Essay and his 1857 letter to Gray. At the meeting the Secretary read the papers out, before going on to six other papers, and there was no discussion of them at the end of the meeting, perhaps because of the amount of business that had been dealt with including an obituary notice for Robert Brown given by Lyell, or possibly due to reluctance to speak out against a theory supported by the eminent Lyell and Hooker. Thomas Bell, who had written up the description of Darwin's reptile specimens from the Beagle expedition, presided over the meeting. He apparently disapproved, and in his annual presidential report presented in May 1859 wrote that "The year which has passed has not, indeed, been marked by any of those striking discoveries which at once revolutionize, so to speak, the department of science on which they bear". However, the vice-president promptly removed all references to immutability from his own paper which was awaiting publication.

As might be expected, the joint paper alerted those subscribers who met the argument for the first time in print, and whose minds were prepared by prior struggles with the species question. Alfred Newton, who held the chair in Zoology and Comparative Anatomy at Cambridge from 1866 to 1907, wrote this: "I sat up late that night to read it [the Linnean Society paper]; and never shall I forget the impression it made upon me. Herein was contained a perfectly simple solution of all the difficulties which had been troubling me for months past. I hardly know whether I at first felt more vexed at the solution not having occurred to me than pleased that it had been found at all" (he was not alone in that thought!—see T.H. Huxley). Newton remained a Darwinian for the rest of his life.

While the meeting took place, Darwin was attending his son's funeral. His family moved to his sister-in-law's in Sussex to escape the fever, which eventually killed six children in the village of Downe. It had been a frightening and miserable fortnight, but he was "more than satisfied" with the outcome of the meeting. He then took his children to the seaside at the Isle of Wight and pushed ahead with an "abstract" of Natural Selection which again began growing to book size. He returned to the Moor Park spa with stomach ailments.

Wallace's reaction, delivered in January 1859, was that he was gratified to have spurred Darwin into making the announcement and that it would have caused him "much pain & regret" if his papers had been published on their own, without Darwin's papers. Darwin was still sensitive on the point, and assured Wallace that he "had absolutely nothing whatever to do with leading Lyell and Hooker to what they thought was a fair course of action". He responded to Wallace's enquiry about what Lyell thought of the theory by saying that "I think he is somewhat staggered, but does not give in and speaks with horror [of] what a job it would be for the next edition of "The Principles" [of Geology] if he were "perverted". But he is most candid and honest, and I think he will end up by being "perverted"." Lyell was still struggling to come to terms with the idea of mankind, with immortal soul, originating from animals, but "Considering his age, his former views and position in society, I think his conduct has been heroic on the subject."

== Publication of the "Origin of Species" ==
Darwin was now working hard on an "abstract" trimmed from his Natural Selection, writing much of it from memory. The chapters were sent to Hooker for correcting as they were completed, which led to a minor disaster when a large bundle was put by accident into the drawer Hooker's wife used to keep paper for the children to draw on. Lyell made arrangements with the publisher John Murray, who had brought out the second edition of The Voyage of the Beagle. Darwin fretted, asking "Does he know all the subject of the book?", and saying that to avoid being more "un-orthodox than the subject makes inevitable" he did not discuss the origin of man, or bring in any discussion about Genesis. Unusually, Murray agreed to publish the manuscript sight unseen, and to pay Darwin two-thirds of the net proceeds. He anticipated printing 500 copies.

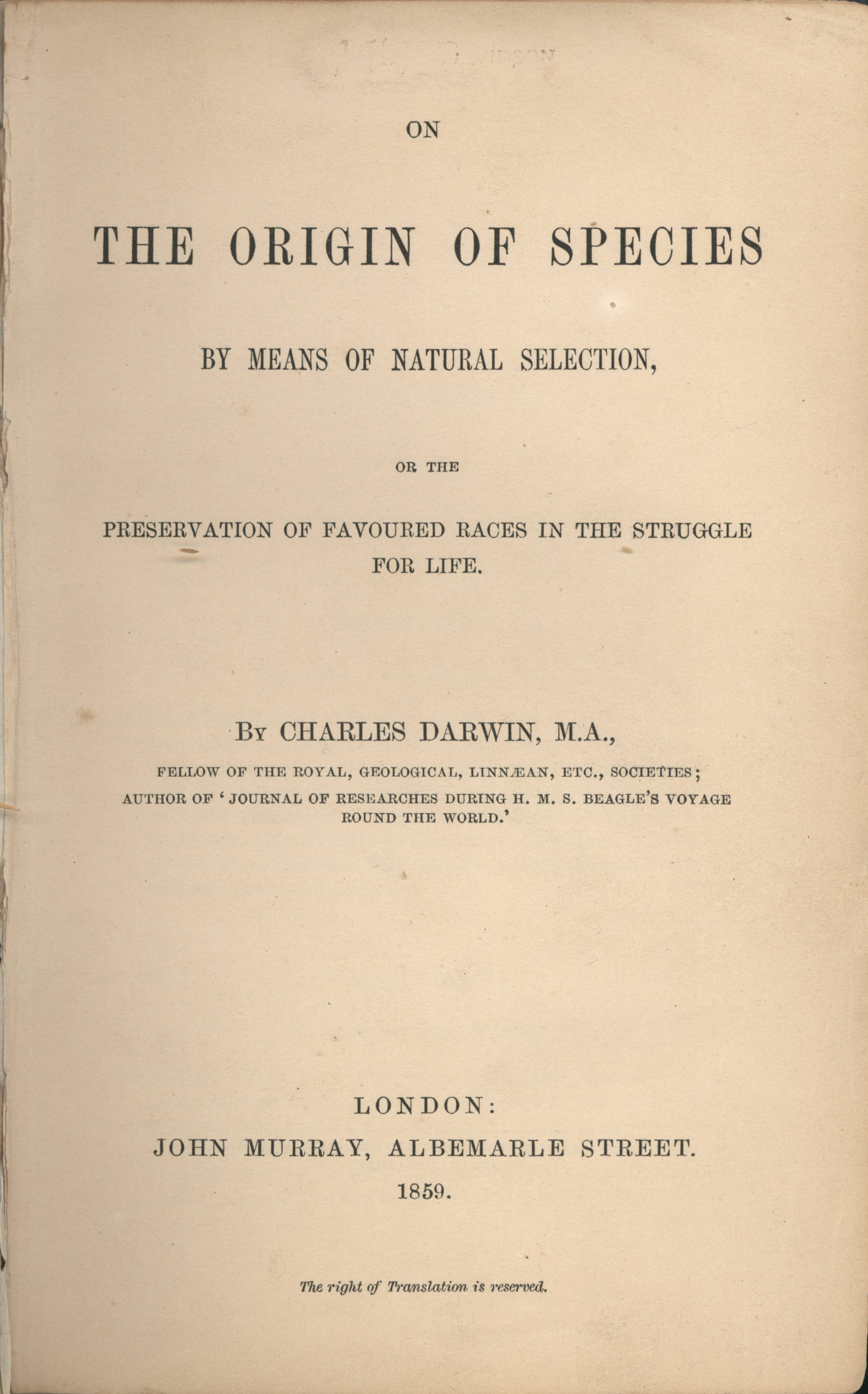
Title page of the first edition of On the Origin of Species

Darwin had decided to call his book An Abstract of an Essay on the Origin of Species and Varieties through Natural Selection, but with Murray's persuasion it was eventually reduced to the snappier On the Origin of Species through Natural Selection. The full title reads On the Origin of Species by Means of Natural Selection, or the Preservation of Favoured Races in the Struggle for Life, with races referring to varieties of domestic and wild organisms and not to human groups.

By the end of May, Darwin's health had failed again, but after a week's hydrotherapy he was able to start correcting the proofs. He struggled on despite rarely being able to write free of stomach pains for more than twenty minutes at a stretch, and made drastic revisions which left Murray with a huge £72 bill for corrections. Murray upped the print run to 1,250 copies, with a publication date in November. A copy was sent to Lyell, with a "foolishly anxious" Darwin hoping that he would "come round". An eager Lyell gave Darwin "very great kudos", though he was still concerned that "the dignity of man is at stake". One of Lyell's relatives commented that it was "sure to be very curious and important... however mortifying it may be to think that our remote ancestors were jelly fishes". Darwin was "sorry to say that I have no 'consolatory view' on the dignity of man. I am content that man will probably advance, and care not much whether we are looked at as mere savages in a remotely distant future."

On 1 October Darwin finished the proofs, suffering from fits of vomiting. He then went off for a two-month stay at Wells House, a hydropathic establishment in the town of Ilkley. He was joined by his family for a time of "frozen misery" in the unusually early winter. Darwin wrote "I have been very bad lately, having had an awful 'crisis' one leg swelled like elephantiasis – eyes almost closed up – covered with a rash & fiery Boils; but they tell me it will surely do me much good – it was like living in Hell." On 2 November he was pleased to receive from Murray a specimen copy bound in royal green cloth, priced at fifteen shillings.

Presentation copies were sent out by Murray, and on 11 and 12 November, still at the spa, Darwin wrote notes to go with these complimentary copies. He disarmingly anticipated their reactions: to Asa Gray "there are very many serious difficulties", to the Revd. John Stevens Henslow "I fear you will not approve of your pupil", to Louis Agassiz "[not sent in] a spirit of defiance or bravado" and to Richard Owen "it will seem 'an abomination'.", amongst others. For Wallace's copy he wrote "God knows what the public will think".

=== Origin of Species goes on sale ===
On the Origin of Species was first published on 24 November 1859, priced at fifteen shillings. The book had been offered to booksellers at Murray's autumn sale on 22 November, and all available copies had been taken up immediately. In total, 1,250 copies were printed but after deducting presentation and review copies, and five for Stationers' Hall copyright, 1,192 copies were available for sale. Significantly, 500 were taken by Mudie's Library, ensuring that the book would be widely circulated.

By then the novelist Charles Kingsley, a Christian socialist country rector, had sent Darwin a letter of praise (dated 18 November) regarding the presentation copy he had received: it was "just as noble a conception of Deity, to believe that He created primal forms capable of self development...as to believe that He required a fresh act of intervention to supply the lacunas which He Himself had made." In the second edition Darwin added these lines to the last chapter, with attribution to "a celebrated author and divine".

See the Reactions to On the Origin of Species for developments following publication, in the context of his life, work and outside influences at the time.
