= John Joseph Bennett =

British botanist (1801–1876)

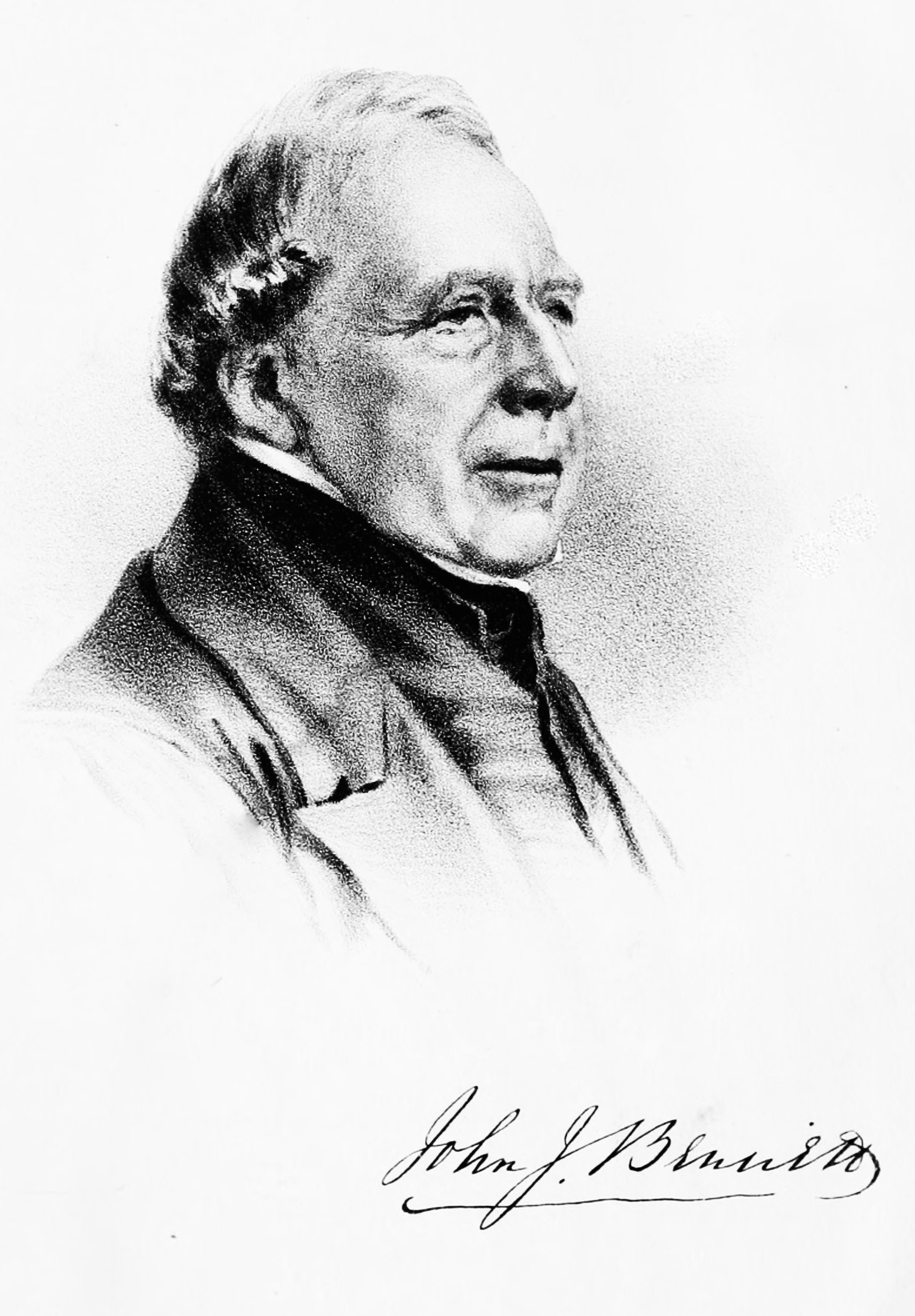
- Born: 8 January 1801; Tottenham, London, England
- Died: 29 February 1876 (aged 75); Maresfield, East Sussex, England
- Relatives: Edward Turner Bennett (brother)
- Scientific career
- Fields: Botany
- Author abbrev. (botany): Benn.

John Joseph Bennett (8 January 1801 – 29 February 1876) was a British physician and botanist. He was the younger brother of the zoologist Edward Turner Bennett.

== Life and work ==
Bennett was born in Tottenham and was educated in Enfield where his contemporaries included John Reeve. He then studied at the Middlesex Hospital and received his medical degree in 1825. Along with his brother he lived on Cavendish Square where they met and assisted John Edward Gray. A plant was named a Bennettia by Gray but it was found to be a synonym of Saussurea. His brother was working on an edition of Gilbert White's book when he died and it had to be completed by John. He became an assistant to Robert Brown keeper of the Banksian herbarium and library at the British Museum from 1827 to 1858, when he succeeded Brown as Keeper of the Botanical Department. He was elected to the Linnean Society in 1828 and served as its secretary from 1840 to 1860. He was elected a fellow of the Royal Society in 1841, and was elected member of Leopoldina in 1864. He retired in 1870 from the British Museum, leaving London to live in Maresfield, East Sussex where he died from a heart condition and is buried in the graveyard of Maresfield Church.

His gravestone has the inscription "He quitted London retiring from the world and its cares to end his days in the peace and quietude of his secluded country home." A bust by Weekes was placed in the British Museum.

On the evening of 30 June 1858, Charles Lyell and Joseph Dalton Hooker passed on to him papers by Alfred Russel Wallace and Charles Darwin, titled "On the Tendency of Species to form Varieties; and on the Perpetuation of Varieties and Species by Natural Means of Selection" respectively. As secretary of the Linnean Society at a meeting on the following evening, 1 July, he read out the papers together with a covering note by Lyell and Hooker. This was the joint publication by Darwin and Wallace of their papers setting out the theory of natural selection, which was received quietly at the time but attracted wide interest when Darwin published On the Origin of Species eighteen months later.

The standard author abbreviation Benn. is used to indicate this person as the author when citing a botanical name.

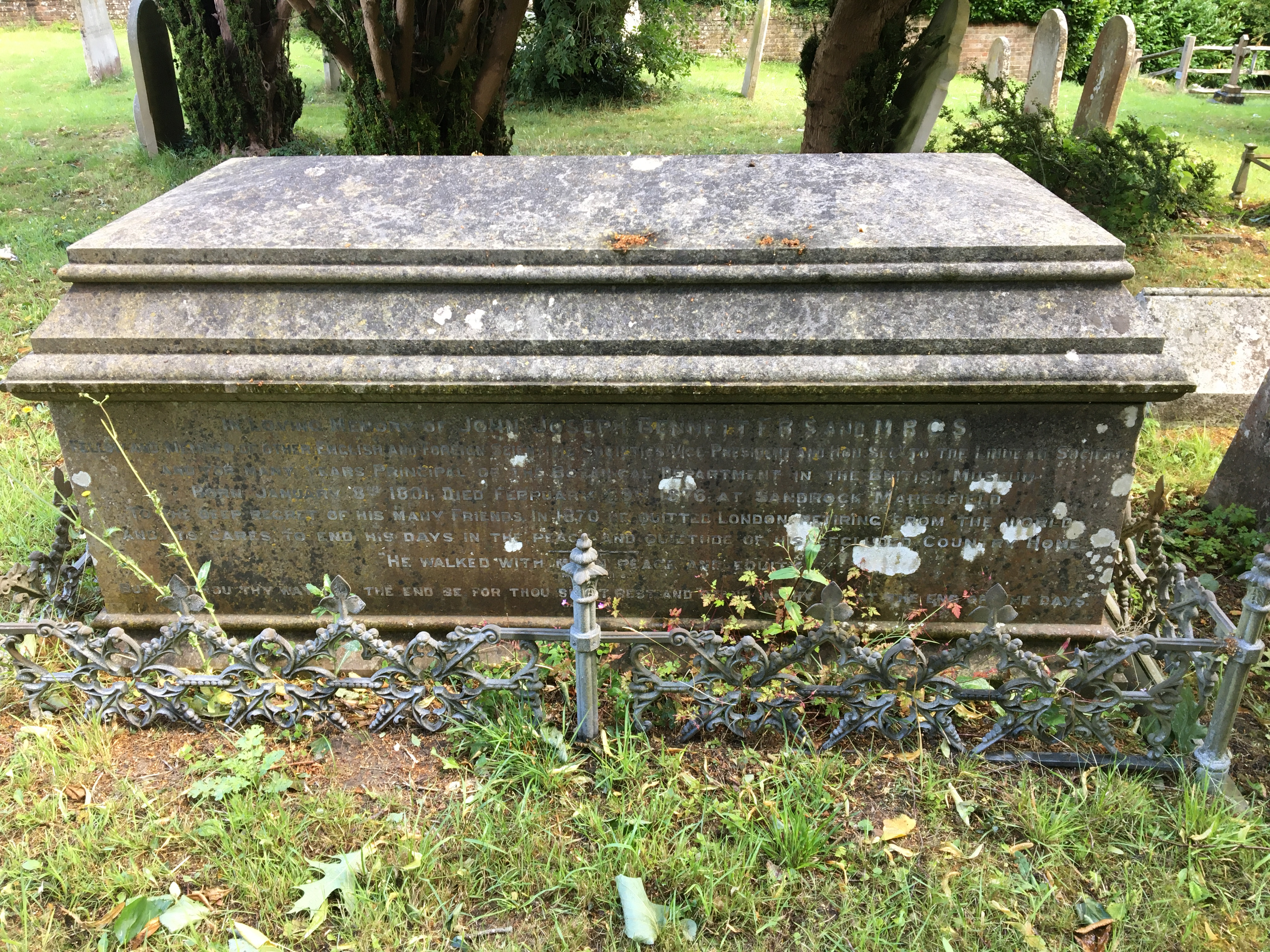
Bennet's gravestone in the graveyard of Maresfield Church

== See also ==
- Publication of Darwin's theory
