= Natural Selection (manuscript) =

1868 manuscript by Charles Darwin

Mutation and Selection

Natural Selection is the manuscript in which Charles Darwin drafted his planned species book to publish his theory of natural selection. He had noted his concepts in an 1842 Pencil Sketch and an 1844 Essay. In September 1854 he "began sorting notes for species Theory" in preparation for publication, and in May 1856 began writing his Natural Selection "big book". He was on track to publish sometime between 1859 and 1861, but was interrupted by Alfred Russel Wallace sending him a similar concept in 1858, so their essays were read together as papers "On the Tendency of Species to form Varieties; and on the Perpetuation of Varieties and Species by Natural Means of Selection". Darwin then wrote an abstract, titled On the Origin of Species by Means of Natural Selection, or the Preservation of Favoured Races in the Struggle for Life, which he published in 1859.

The first two chapters were published in 1868 as The Variation of Animals and Plants Under Domestication. The unpublished eight and a half chapters of Natural Selection were among the manuscripts collated after Darwin's death, and were first transcribed and published in 1975, by Robert C. Stauffer.
