= On the Tendency of Species to form Varieties; and on the Perpetuation of Varieties and Species by Natural Means of Selection =

1858 scientific article

"On the Tendency of Species to form Varieties; and on the Perpetuation of Varieties and Species by Natural Means of Selection" is the title of a journal article, comprising and resulting from the joint presentation of two scientific papers to the Linnean Society of London on 1 July 1858: On The Tendency of Varieties to Depart Indefinitely from the Original Type by Alfred Russel Wallace and an Extract from an unpublished Work on Species from Charles Darwin's Essay of 1844. The article also includes an Abstract of a Letter from Darwin to Asa Gray, and an introductory letter by Joseph Dalton Hooker and Charles Lyell. The article was the first announcement of the Darwin–Wallace theory of evolution by natural selection; and appeared in print on 20 August 1858. The presentation of the papers spurred Darwin to write a condensed "abstract" of his "big book", Natural Selection. This was published in November 1859 as On the Origin of Species.

== Events leading up to the publication ==
On the voyage of the Beagle the young Charles Darwin took a break between graduating and starting his career as a clergyman to study the natural history of South America, an interest he had developed at the University of Edinburgh and the University of Cambridge. Influenced by Charles Lyell's Principles of Geology, he became an able geologist as well as collecting plant and animal specimens, and fossils of gigantic extinct mammals. By the return journey, he was connecting patterns of geographical and historical distribution, and starting to doubt the stability of Species. In September 1838 he conceived his theory of natural selection as the cause of evolution, then as well as developing his career as a geologist and writer worked privately on finding evidence and answering possible objections. He wrote out his ideas in an 1842 "pencil sketch", then in an essay written in 1844. He discussed transmutation with his friend Joseph Dalton Hooker, who read the essay in 1847. After turning his attention to biology and completing eight years of work on barnacles, Darwin intensified work on his theory of species in 1854.

Alfred Russel Wallace, a naturalist working in Borneo, had a paper on the "introduction" of species published in Annals and Magazine of Natural History. This made guarded comments about evolution, and in the spring of 1856 it was noticed by Lyell who drew it to the attention of Darwin who was then working out a strategy for presenting his theory. Darwin apparently mistook Wallace's meaning, writing "nothing very new ... Uses my simile of tree, [but] it seems all creation with him". However, he spelt out the details of Natural Selection to Lyell, who found the idea hard to accept but urged Darwin to publish to establish priority. On 14 May 1856 Darwin began what became his draft for a book titled Natural Selection.

Wallace collected specimens and corresponded with Darwin from Borneo. In December 1857, he wrote to ask if Darwin's book would delve into human origins, to which Darwin responded that "I think I shall avoid the whole subject, as so surrounded with prejudices, though I fully admit that it is the highest & most interesting problem for the naturalist". He encouraged Wallace's theorising, saying "without speculation there is no good & original observation", adding that "I go much further than you".

Wallace wrote his paper On The Tendency of Varieties to Depart Indefinitely from the Original Type at Ternate in February 1858 and sent it to Darwin with a request to send it on to Lyell. Darwin received it on 18 June 1858, and wrote to Lyell that "your words have come true with a vengeance,... forestalled" and "If Wallace had my MS. sketch written out in 1842, he could not have made a better short abstract!" While Wallace had not asked for publication, Darwin would, "of course, at once write and offer to send [it] to any journal" that Wallace chose. He sadly added that "all my originality, whatever it may amount to, will be smashed". Lyell's immediate response urged Darwin to publish his own ideas, and in his reply of 25 June Darwin agreed that he could point to his own Essay of 1844 which Hooker had read in 1847, and a letter to Asa Gray of 1857 showing that he was still developing the ideas, "so that I could most truly say and prove that I take nothing from Wallace. I should be extremely glad now to publish a sketch of my general views in about a dozen pages or so. But I cannot persuade myself that I can do so honourably... I would far rather burn my whole book than that he or any man should think that I had behaved in a paltry spirit", also requesting that Hooker be invited to give a second opinion. Darwin was overwrought by a deepening crisis of illness of his baby son Charles Waring Darwin, who died of scarlet fever on 28 June. On the morning of the 29th he acknowledged Hooker's letters, writing "I cannot think now", then that night he read the letters, and though "quite prostrated", got his servant to take to Hooker Wallace's essay, the letter to Asa Gray and the Essay of 1844, leaving matters in the hands of Lyell and Hooker.

Lyell and Hooker had decided on a joint publication at the Linnean Society of London of Wallace's paper together with an extract from Darwin's essay and his letter to Asa Gray. The last meeting of the society before the summer recess had been postponed following the death of former president the botanist Robert Brown on 10 June 1858, and was to be held on 1 July. On the afternoon of 30 June Mrs. Hooker copied out extracts from the handwritten documents they had just received from Darwin, then that evening Lyell and Hooker handed them in to the secretary with a covering letter.

== The reading ==
The papers were read to the Linnean Society of London on 1 July 1858, by the Secretary John Joseph Bennett. Neither author was present. Darwin was attending the funeral of his son, and Wallace was still in Borneo. The meeting was chaired by the president of the society, Thomas Bell, who had written up the description of Darwin's reptile specimens from the Beagle expedition.

About thirty were present, including two unnamed guests from overseas, with many there to hear an obituary notice for the former president and botanist Robert Brown given by Lyell. Wallace's natural history agent Samuel Stevens happened to be present, while Darwin's friends there included William Benjamin Carpenter and the geologist William Henry Fitton. Amongst the others, Daniel Oliver and Arthur Henfry would later support evolution, while Cuthbert Collingwood became an opponent. George Bentham was persuaded by Hooker to step down so that the Darwin and Wallace papers were first on the agenda, followed by six other papers on botanical and zoological topics. Bell had introduced discussions at the end of meetings, but there was no discussion of natural selection, perhaps because of the amount of business that had been dealt with, or possibly due to polite reluctance to speak out against a theory which the eminent Lyell and Hooker were supporting. Bentham noted that the audience appeared fatigued. Hooker later said there was "no semblance of a discussion", though "it was talked over with bated breath" at tea afterwards, and in his reminiscences many years later thought "the subject [was] too ominous for the old school to enter the lists before armouring." Although Bell apparently disapproved, the vice-president promptly removed all references to immutability from his own paper which was awaiting publication.

Darwin wrote to Wallace to explain what had occurred, enclosing a letter which Hooker wrote at Darwin's request. His next action was to get his family away from the danger of infection, both himself and Emma exhausted by sickening fear about the safety of their children. The day after the funeral they moved to his sister-in-law's in Sussex, then on to Portsmouth and the Isle of Wight. At first they stayed in the King's Hotel, Shanklin, and on 30 July Darwin began writing an "abstract" of his book on Natural Selection, planning a short paper in response to Hooker's urging to publish a scientific paper in the Linnean journal. They next rented a villa in Sandown and Darwin pressed on, with the facts he felt necessary to support his "abstract" expanding far beyond the thirty pages Hooker had originally suggested.

== The paper ==
The paper, consisting of the letter and papers, was published in the Zoological Journal of the Linnean Society 3 (20 August): 46–50.

The paper consisted of a communication letter by Joseph Dalton Hooker and Charles Lyell dated 30 June 1858, giving information on the three sections of the papers. The introduction is shown below, along with the section headings:

MY DEAR SIR,—The accompanying papers, which we have the honour of communicating to the Linnean Society, and which all related to the same subject, viz. the Laws which affect the Production of Varieties, Races, and Species, contain the results of the investigations of two indefatigable naturalists, Mr. Charles Darwin and Mr. Alfred Wallace.

The gentlemen having, independently and unknown to one another, conceived the same very ingenious theory to account for the appearance and perpetuation of varieties and of specific forms on our planet, and both fairly claim the merit of being original thinkers in this important line of inquiry; but neither of them having published his views, though Mr. Darwin has for many years past been repeatedly urged by us to do so, and both authors having now unreservedly placed their papers in our hands, we think it would best promote the interests of science that a selection from them should be laid before the Linnean Society. Taken in the order of their dates, they consist of:—

I. Extract from an unpublished Work on Species, by C. DARWIN, Esq., consisting of a portion of a Chapter entitled, "On the Variation of Organic Beings in a state of Nature; on the Natural Means of Selection; on the Comparison of Domestic Races and true Species."

II. Abstract of a Letter from C. DARWIN, Esq., to Prof. ASA GRAY, Boston, US, dated Down, September 5th, 1857.

III. On the Tendency of Varieties to depart indefinitely from the Original Type. By ALFRED RUSSEL WALLACE.

The communication letter briefly describes the first two, and regarding Wallace's paper states that he sent to Darwin "with the expressed wish that it should be forwarded to Sir Charles Lyell, if Mr. Darwin thought it sufficiently novel and interesting. So highly did Mr. Darwin appreciate the value of the views therein set forth, that he proposed, in a letter to Sir Charles Lyell, to obtain Mr. Wallace's consent to allow the Essay to be published as soon as possible. Of this step we highly approved, provided Mr. Darwin did not withhold from the public, as he was strongly inclined to do (in favour of Mr. Wallace), the memoir which he had himself written on the same subject, and which, as before stated, one of us had perused in 1844, and the contents of which we had both of us been privy to for many years. On representing this to Mr. Darwin, he gave us permission to make what use we thought proper of his memoir, &c.; and in adopting our present course, of presenting it to the Linnean Society, we have explained to him that we are not solely considering the relative claims to priority of himself and his friend, but the interests of science generally".

== Impact of the publication ==
The paper was reprinted and reviewed in several magazines including The Zoologist, whose judgement was "on asking myself, 'What does all this prove?' the only answer I could make was, 'A possibility'." It was commented on in some reviews and letters. The Linnean Society President Thomas Bell in his presidential report of May 1859 wrote that "The year which has passed has not, indeed, been marked by any of those striking discoveries which at once revolutionize, so to speak, the department of science on which they bear". Years later, Darwin could only recall one review; Professor Haughton of Dublin claimed that "all that was new in them was false, and what was true was old."

Despite illness, Darwin pressed on with writing the "abstract" of his "big book" on Natural Selection; this condensed version was published in November 1859 as On the Origin of Species.

== As an influence on cybernetics ==
In a largely overlooked passage from Wallace's essay (p. 62), he says of the evolutionary principle:

The action of this principle is exactly like that of the centrifugal governor of the steam engine, which checks and corrects any irregularities almost before they become evident; and in like manner no unbalanced deficiency in the animal kingdom can ever reach any conspicuous magnitude, because it would make itself felt at the very first step, by rendering existence difficult and extinction almost sure soon to follow.

The cybernetician and anthropologist Gregory Bateson would observe in the 1970s that, although seeing it only as an illustration, Wallace had "probably said the most powerful thing that’d been said in the 19th century". Bateson revisited the topic in his 1979 book Mind and Nature: A Necessary Unity, and other scholars have continued to explore the connection between natural selection and systems theory.
