= Darwin from Insectivorous Plants to Worms =

Life of Charles Darwin from 1873 to 1882

Between 1873 and 1882, the life and work of Charles Darwin from Insectivorous Plants to Worms continued with investigations into carnivorous and climbing plants that had begun with his previous work. Worries about family illnesses contributed to his interest in Galton's ideas of "hereditary improvement" (which would later be called eugenics). He continued to help with the work of Downe parish church and associated village amenities, despite problems with control being seized by a new High Church vicar, and he remained on good terms with the Church's patron, the Revd. John Brodie Innes. There was continuing interest in Charles Darwin's views on religion, but he remained reticent.

Despite repeated problems and delays caused by Charles Darwin's illness, his work on evolution-related experiments and investigations continued, with the production of books on the movement of climbing plants, insectivorous plants, the effects of cross and self fertilisation of plants, different forms of flowers on plants of the same species, and The Power of Movement in Plants. His ideas on evolution were increasingly accepted in scientific circles despite some bitter disputes, and he received numerous honours. As well as writing out his own autobiography for his family, he wrote an introduction to a biography of his grandfather Erasmus Darwin. In his last book, he returned to the effect earthworms have on soil formation.

He died in Downe, Kent, England, on 19 April 1882. He had expected to be buried in St Mary's churchyard at Downe, but at the request of Darwin's colleagues, William Spottiswoode (President of the Royal Society) arranged for Darwin to be given a major ceremonial funeral and buried in Westminster Abbey, close to John Herschel and Isaac Newton.

== Background ==
In the aftermath of the publication of On the Origin of Species through Natural Selection in 1859, Charles Darwin's allies Charles Lyell, Joseph Dalton Hooker, Thomas Huxley, Alfred Russel Wallace and Asa Gray in America worked to spread acceptance of its ideas despite difficulty in coming to terms with natural selection and man's descent from animals.

Darwin's research and experiments on plants and animals continued, and his extensive writings countered the arguments against evolution, particularly those put by the Duke of Argyll and St George Mivart.

== Family matters, eugenics ==
Darwin's sons George and Horace were ill and arrived home at Christmas 1872 for nursing. Darwin turned from his insectivorous plants to a more leisurely update of his monograph on climbing plants.

He was intrigued by Galton's latest "hereditary improvement" ideas (which would be called Eugenics after 1883), proposing that society should breed out mental and physical disability and improve the nation's stock by introducing "a sentiment of caste among those who are naturally gifted". Families would be registered and incentives offered so that the best children chosen from each "superior family" would marry and reproduce. Darwin, aware that of his brood only William had good health, had already dismissed the aims as too "utopian" in the Descent of Man. He thought these new proposals impractical if voluntary and politically horrifying if enforced by compulsory registration, even were they the "sole feasible" way of "improving the human race". He felt it better simply to publicise the "all-important principle of inheritance" and let people pursue the "grand" objective for themselves. In any case it was too late for his own infirm offspring.

Huxley was also ill, needing a rest and harried by a neighbour suing over a damp basement. The X Club (a dining club formed in November 1864 to support the evolutionary "new reformation" in naturalism, including Huxley, Hooker, John Tyndall, Busk, Spencer, and Spottiswoode) raised a £2,000 collection for him, primed by Darwin with £300. Darwin's spirits were again downcast when Lyell's wife died.

In June 1873 Darwin resumed work on his insectivorous plants, with some distractions as his wife Emma took care of the seven Huxley children while Huxley and Hooker went on holiday to the continent. Having young children in the house was like the 1850s again.

=== Parish conflict ===
A new reforming High Church vicar, the Revd. George Sketchley Ffinden, had been imposing his ideas since taking over the parish in November 1871. Darwin had to write to the patron, John Brodie Innes, explaining what had upset the parishioners. Ffinden now usurped control of the village school which had been run for years by a committee of Darwin, Lubbock and the incumbent priest, with a "conscience clause" which protected the children from Anglican indoctrination. Ffinden began lessons on the Thirty-nine Articles of the Anglican faith, an unwelcome move from the point of view of the Baptists in the village. Darwin withdrew from the committee and cut his annual donation to the church, but continued with the Friendly Society work.

Hensleigh Wedgwood's daughter Effie had married Thomas "Theta" Farrer in May, and on 5 August 1873 the Darwins went to visit them for a few days. They arrived to hear that a fortnight previously the Farrer's servants had been called to an accident. Earl Granville's riding companion Samuel Wilberforce had been killed in a fall from his horse, and was subsequently laid out in state for two days in the Farrer's drawing room. Although an opponent of the Origin, Wilberforce had always thought Darwin a "capital fellow".

=== Pause ===
At home, a heated discussion with Hooker ended with Darwin lying in bed with his memory gone and "a severe shock continually passing through my brain". Emma feared an epileptic fit, but the doctor put him on a diet and in September he returned to work on insectivorous plants. His correspondence continued, funding worthy projects and acknowledging countless gifts including Das Kapital from "a sincere admirer", Karl Marx, which Darwin had difficulty in following, but hoped that both their efforts towards "the extension of knowledge... [would] add to the happiness of mankind".

Frank struggled with his medical studies, and after finishing his thesis on animal tissues he was to assist with plant tissues at Downe. George's legal career had been ended by stomach illness and he had spent two years going to spas. He began writing topical essays, the first in the Contemporary Review on Galton. His latest essay boldly dismissed prayer, divine morals and "future rewards & punishments". Darwin urged him not to publish it for some months, and "to pause, pause, pause."

=== Fiske ===
During a visit in November 1873 the Harvard philosopher John Fiske amused the X Club with his story of a cockney in New York warning him "What, that 'orrid hold hinfidel 'Uxley? Why, we don't think hanythink of 'im in Hingland! We think 'e's 'orrid!", himself writing that "I am quite wild over Huxley... what a pleasure to meet such a clean-cut mind! It is like Saladin's sword which cut through the cushion." and "Old Darwin is the dearest, sweetest, loveliest old grandpa that ever was. And on the whole he impresses me with his strength more than any man I have seen yet. There is a charming kind of quiet strength about him and about everything he does. He isn't burning and eager like Huxley. He has a mild blue eye, and is the gentlest of gentle old fellows. [His] long white hair and enormous white beard [made him] very picturesque... guileless simplicity... I am afraid I shall never see him again, for his health is very bad. Of all my days in England I prize today the most."

== New edition of The Descent of Man ==
Darwin tackled a new edition of the Descent of Man, and offered the self-financing Wallace the work of assisting him. Wallace quoted seven shillings an hour, mentioning that he was "dipping into politics" proposing nationalisation of coal mining. Emma found out and had the task given to their son George, so Darwin had to write apologetically to Wallace, adding "I hope to Heaven that politics will not replace natural science."

=== Parish reading room ===
For two years, Emma had organised a winter reading room in the local school for local labourers, who subscribed a penny a week to smoke and play games, with "Respectable newspapers & a few books... & a respectable housekeeper..there every evening to maintain decorum." This was a common facility to save men from "resorting to the public house". In 1873 the Revd. Ffinden opposed it, as "Coffee drinking, bagatelle & other games" had been allowed and "the effects of tobacco smoke & spitting" were seen when the children returned in the morning. Emma got Darwin to get the approval of the education inspectorate in London, and just before Christmas 1873 the Darwins and Lubbocks got the agreement of the school committee, offering to pay for any repairs needed "to afford every possible opportunity to the working class for self improvement & amusement". A furious Ffinden huffed that it was "quite out of order" for the Darwins to have gone to the inspectorate behind his back. In the autumn of 1874 Darwin let off steam at Ffinden and formally resigned from the school committee on health grounds.

=== Spiritualism ===
Francis Galton was attracted to the recent spiritualism movement. On a visit to London in January 1874 Darwin attended a séance at Erasmus's house with relatives including Hensleigh Wedgwood, as well as Huxley. George had hired the medium Charles Williams, and they sat round the table in the dark, but as the room grew stuffy Darwin went upstairs to lie down, missing the show, with sparks, sounds and the table rising above their heads. While Galton thought it a "good séance", Darwin later wrote "The Lord have mercy on us all, if we have to believe such rubbish" and told Emma that it was "all imposture" and "it would take an enormous weight of evidence" to convince him otherwise. At a second séance Huxley and George found that Williams was nothing but a cheat, to Darwin's relief. Emma told Hensleigh's daughter Snow that Charles "won't believe it, he dislikes the thought of it so much". Snow remembered that her uncle "used to look upon it as a great weakness if one allowed wish to influence belief" and when Emma said that "he does not always act up to his principles" Snow thought that was "what one means by bigotry", to which Emma said "Oh yes, he is a regular bigot".

=== New edition of Descent ===
Darwin continued painfully rewriting his books with the help of Henrietta and George, incorporating ideas from Galton and new anecdotes. He bought from Lubbock the Sandwalk he had been renting for years, but the price seemed excessive and affected their friendship. News of a dispute involving the removal of George Bentham from presidency of the Linnean Society, allegedly spurred on by Owen, led Darwin to write "What a demon on earth Owen is. I do hate him". With Huxley's assistance he updated the Descent on ape-brain inheritance, which Huxley thought "pounds the enemy into a jelly... though none but anatomists" would know it.

The manuscript was completed in April 1874, and the publisher John Murray planned a 12 shilling half-price edition to replicate the success of the cheap revision of the Origin. Darwin left the proofs to George, and turned again to Plants. The new edition was published on 13 November with the price cut to the bone at 9 shillings.

== Insectivorous plants ==
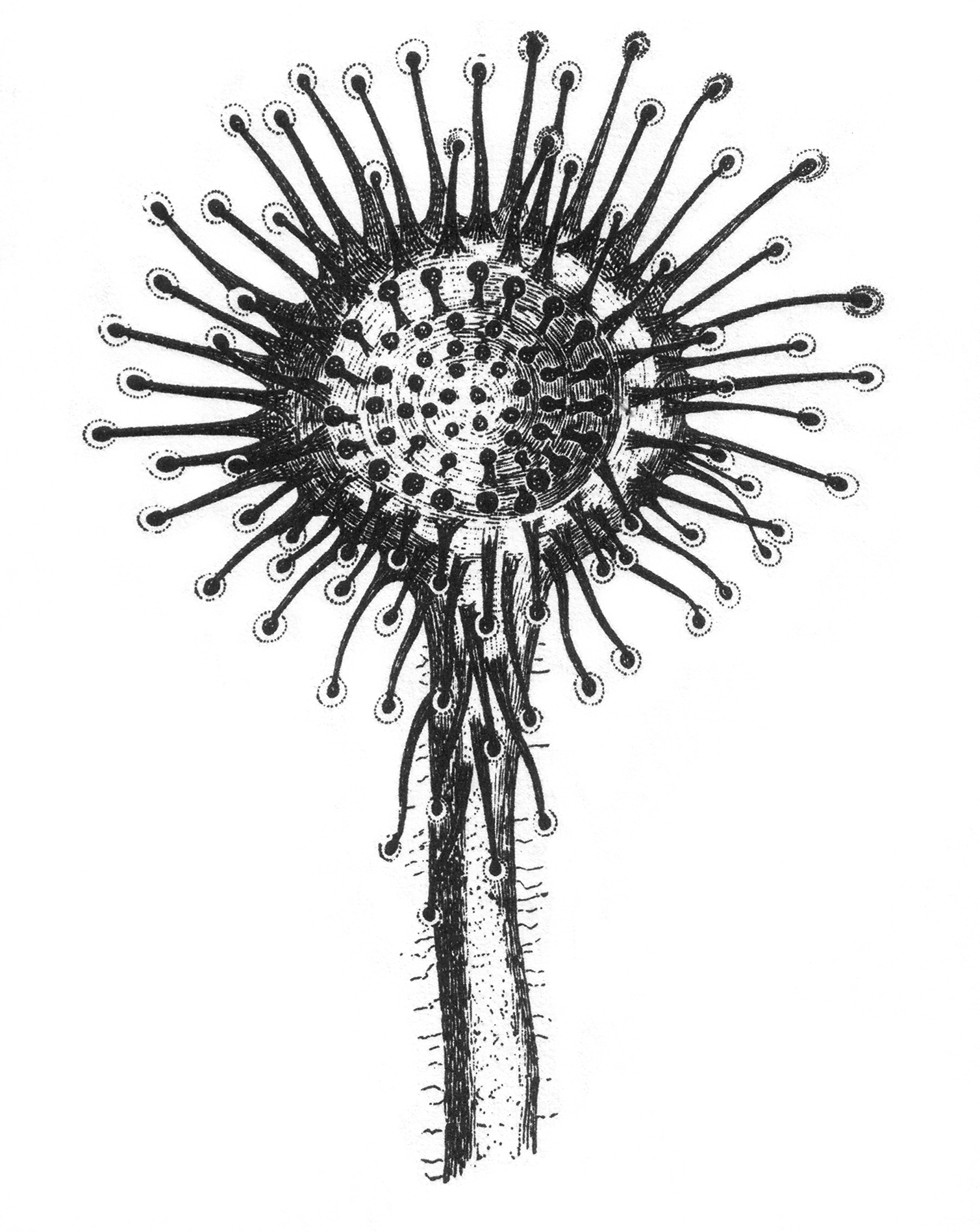
Figure 1 from Insectivorous Plants

During 1874 Darwin contacted many of his old friends to assist with experimentation on insectivorous or carnivorous plants. Helpers included Hooker and his assistant William Thiselton-Dyer at Kew, John Burdon-Sanderson at University College London running lab tests on the plant's digestion, and Asa Gray at Harvard. Enquiries to Nature magazine brought in sacks of mail to be dealt with by Frank, who settled into Brodie Innes's old house in the village and married Amy Ruck on 23 July. At this time the family was joined by George Romanes who had been a student with Frank at Cambridge. Plants experimented on were members of the genera Drosera and Pinguicula, including D. rotundifolia and P. vulgaris.

=== Controversy with Mivart ===
As well as working on the proofs, George Darwin made a statistical analysis of first cousin marriages (three times more frequent in "our rank" than in the lower) and, influenced by Galton, published an article on "beneficial restrictions in marriage". Mivart attacked this anonymously in the Quarterly Review, misinterpreting advocacy of divorce in cases of criminality or advice as " the most oppressive laws, and the encouragement of vice in order to check population", talking of "hideous sexual criminality". A furious Darwin told George to take legal advice while he contacted the publisher of his books and the Quarterly, John Murray, threatening to "take his business elsewhere".

Darwin's holiday at Southampton with William was overshadowed as he drafted George's response. John Tyndall's address to the British Association later that month laid claim to "wrest from theology the entire domain of cosmological theory" and led to calls for his prosecution for blasphemy. Lyell, now nearly blind and in deteriorating health, wrote to Darwin applauding the boost to "you and your theory of evolution" despite his qualms about the hereafter. Darwin was sympathetic, but did "not feel any innate conviction" of life after death. The October issue of the Quarterly carried George's response and an "apology" from Mivart which still maintained "that the doctrines... are most dangerous and pernicious" and infuriated Darwin.

On 13 November Hooker's wife Fanny died suddenly, and a devastated Hooker felt unable to return home after the funeral and brought his family to Downe. Emma looked after the children, and when Hooker returned to Kew, Darwin urged "hard work" to overcome his "utter desolation". Later, Darwin mentioned the Mivart argument and Hooker rallied the X Club (a dining club formed in November 1864 to support the evolutionary "new reformation" in naturalism, including Huxley, Hooker, John Tyndall, Busk, Spencer, and Spottiswoode). Huxley eagerly used a review to attack "anonymous slander", telling Darwin that he "ought to be like one of the blessed gods of Elysium, and let the inferior deities do battle with the infernal powers." Mivart confidentially pleaded to make amends, but Huxley told Darwin that the "most effectual punishment" was to "give him the cold shoulder". Darwin was itching to speak his mind, and when no apology had come by 12 January 1875 he wrote vowing never to communicate with Mivart again.

=== Insectivorous Plants, parish and vivisection ===
Darwin struggled on, by February 1875 telling George that "I know full well the feeling of life being objectless & all being vanity of vanities", and Hooker that he was even "ready to commit suicide". The death of Lyell on 22 February had him feeling "as if we were all soon to go". Their friendship had cooled after Lyell declined to back natural selection, and Darwin pleaded illness rather than take part as a pall-bearer at the funeral in Westminster Abbey. In March Darwin took the proofs of Insectivorous Plants to Murray.

For a year the vicar had refused to speak to any of the Darwins, and when two evening lectures were proposed for the village, Lubbock had to act as an intermediary in requesting use of the schoolroom. The committee agreed, but Ffinden refused to co-operate, writing that "I had long been aware of the harmful tendencies to revealed religion of Mr. Darwin's views, but.. I had fully determined.. not to let my difference of opinion interfere with a friendly feeling as neighbours, trusting that God's grace might in time bring one so highly gifted intellectually and morally to a better mind." Darwin was equally haughty in return, condescending that "If Mr. F bows to Mrs D. and myself, we will return it". He found that dealing with Mivart and Ffinden was increasing his private hostility to Christianity.

Darwin's daughter Henrietta at first supported a petition drawn up by Frances Power Cobbe demanding anti-vivisection legislation. Though Darwin was an animal lover and had never carried out vivisection, he persuaded her that "Physiology can only progress by experiments on living animals". During his spring break in London he took the matter up with his contacts, at first thinking of a counter-petition, then on Huxley's advice seeking support lobbying for a pre-emptive bill to provide for regulated vivisection with what he called a "more humanitarian aspect". The hint to the fox-hunting houses of parliament that a ban could lead to further restrictions helped, and though Cobbe's bill reached the House of Lords on 4 May 1875 a week before the scientist's bill reached the House of Commons, the Home Secretary announced a Royal Commission of inquiry to resolve the arguments, with Huxley co-opted on to the Commission.

The demand for Darwin as an author was shown when Insectivorous Plants, a 450-page catalogue of plant experiments, sold out quickly and in July a 1,000 copy reprint sold out within a fortnight.

== Variation revised ==
Now Darwin turned to work on a new edition of The Variation of Animals and Plants Under Domestication incorporating additions from the hundreds of letters and scores of monographs that had been sent to Darwin in the seven years since it had been published. Parts were altered or discarded, and George Romanes set aside work on jellyfish to graft vegetable plants in experiments aimed at finding out about the "gemmules" which Darwin thought formed the mechanism of inheritance of characteristics. Investigations into "pangenesis" by Galton had tried blood transfusions between different breeds of rabbits without success. Darwin continued to look for proof of inheritance of acquired characteristics, amassing evidence of blacksmith's children being muscular and babies born with scars matching those of their parents. He would not follow Huxley in discarding these ideas, and Descent had presented such inheritance as a significant factor in human evolution.

Darwin had long been concerned that his children could have inherited his weaknesses. He was proud that Frank seemed to have inherited his interest in natural history, coming to Down House from the village to carry out plant experiments, and put his son up for a Fellowship of the Linnean Society.

== Cross and Self Fertilisation ==
With Variation at the printers and with his old essay on The Movements and Habits of Climbing Plants due out in November 1875 with "illustrations... drawn by my son, George", Darwin wrote The Effects of Cross and Self Fertilisation in the Vegetable Kingdom. This drew on a painstaking series of experiments, protecting the plants from insects and controlling the pollination of flowers, counting the seeds and checking them for fertility, repeated for up to ten generations with detailed records kept at every stage.

Darwin tabulated the results, Galton checked his statistics, and they found the crossed plants significantly superior to self-fertilised ones in height, weight, vigour and fertility. The same principle would apply to people, and though the attempt to get a question on the census had failed, George analysed data from lunatic asylums and the Pall Mall Gazette which Darwin cited as showing a small effect produced by first-cousin marriages.

While Emma ensured that he took short breaks, Darwin pressed on with work as "my sole pleasure in life" and finished the first draft of Fertilisation in May 1876, promptly going on to a revision of Orchids.

== Recollections ==
They visited Hensleigh and Fanny to celebrate the announcement that Frank's wife Amy was five months pregnant, and Charles and Emma would shortly become grandparents. Darwin decided to leave a posthumous memoir for his family, and on Sunday 28 May 1876 he began Recollections of the Development of my mind and character. He found this candid private memoir easy going, covering his childhood, university, life on the Beagle and developing work in science. A section headed "Religious Belief" opened just before his marriage, and frankly discussed his long disagreement with Emma. (see Charles Darwin's views on religion) He recalled Annie and thought of how, but for her untimely death, she would now "have grown into a delightful woman... Tears still come into my eyes, when I think of her sweet ways". He completed his memoir on 3 August, concluding that after his book on fertilisation was published, "my strength... will probably be exhausted".

On 7 September the baby, named Bernard, was born at Down House, but his mother suffered a fever and convulsions, and died four days later at the age of 26. Darwin thought it the "most dreadful thing", and Frank in a state of shock and grief moved into Down House with the baby. The contractors were brought in to extend the house for him, and Frank carried on with mechanical chores for his father, making a fair copy of the memoir and correcting proofs of Orchids.

=== Liberalism ===
Despite Ffinden's continuing opposition, Emma's project of a parish reading room for labourers was restarted and opened before Christmas. Darwin saw Orchids and Cross and Self Fertilisation published as he wrote his next book on flowers. In February 1877 he attended the George and Dragon in his position as treasurer and persuaded the village labourers, who were suffering from wage cuts and a threat to their jobs in a farm slump, not to disband the Friendly Society and take the proceeds, but to keep some protection for their longer term security by keeping the books open while distributing their surplus funds. His old Whig principles fitted well with the Self-Help philosophy of another Murray author, Samuel Smiles, who had impressed Darwin.

As a "thorough Liberal", Darwin supported Gladstone, the "Grand Old Man" of British politics. Three months earlier Darwin had backed the outcry against the "Bulgarian horrors" when 15,000 (Christian) Bulgarian rebels were massacred by Muslim "Turkish" troops of the Ottoman Empire, and supported Gladstone's calls for Russian intervention in opposition to the Tory government's support for the Turks. Marx thought this a hypocritical preference for a Christian oppressor, and complained about Darwin's support for the "piggish demonstration". On 10 March Gladstone, while doing the rounds of his backbenchers and visiting Lubbock, turned up with his entourage at Down House and for two hours regaled a silent Darwin with comments from his latest pamphlet on "Turkish terrorism", and "launched forth his thunderbolts with unexhausted zest". Before leaving he asked Darwin if evolution meant that the future belonged to America as the Eastern civilisations decayed; after thinking it over, Darwin responded "Yes." Watching Gladstone's "erect alert figure" walking away, he said "What an honour that such a great man should come to visit me!"

A fortnight after Gladstone's visit, the leading secularist, militant atheist and unofficial Liberal candidate Charles Bradlaugh with co-publisher Annie Besant caused public outrage by publishing do-it-yourself contraceptive advice from an American doctor, Charles Knowlton, in a sixpenny pamphlet Fruits of Philosophy. Bradlaugh and Besant were accused of obscenity and committed for trial on 18 June 1877. A fortnight beforehand they subpoenaed Darwin for their defence, expecting his support. Appalled, he wrote protesting the "great suffering" this would put him to, and advised that he would have to denounce the defendants as he had "long held an opposite opinion" on birth control, as evidenced by an extract from the Descent of Man stating that "our natural rate of increase, though leading to many and obvious evils, must not be greatly diminished by any means." The practice of contraception would "spread to unmarried women & would destroy chastity on which the family bond depends; & the weakening of this bond would be the greatest of all evils to mankind."

=== Holidays ===
The subpoena was dropped, and Darwin was not held back from holidaying at Leith Hill and Southampton for his much needed "rest" which, as usual, meant working furiously away from home. He visited Stonehenge for the first time, examining how worm castings had buried the megaliths over time. Emma feared that the day-trip involving two hours train journey and a 24-mile drive would "half kill" him, but he was in wonderful form even after digging in the hot sun.

In mid July 1877 his work on the sex life of plants culminated in the publication of The Different Forms of Flowers on Plants of the Same Species, dedicated to Asa Gray. He could not "endure being idle" and turned to his next book, on plant movement. Emma got him away for his autumn break to Abinger on the North Downs, and though Wallace now lived only a few miles away, Darwin avoided him, diplomatically writing that he "wished to come over to see you, but driving tires me so much that my courage failed."

=== Honorary doctorate ===
The University of Cambridge had come round to Darwinism, and on Saturday 17 November the family attended the Senate House for a ceremony in which Darwin was awarded an honorary Doctorate of Laws (L.L.D.) in front of crowds of students, who strung a cord across the chamber with a monkey-marionette which was removed by a Proctor then replaced by a "missing link", a beribboned ring which hung over the crowd through the ceremony.

Darwin entered to a roar of approval. The Public Orator gave his panegyric describing Darwin's work with purple Latin prose, to some good humoured heckling from the students, and distanced the dignitaries from "the unlovely tribe of apes" saying "'Mores in utroques dispares' – the moral nature of the two races is different".

Emma had a headache, so she and Darwin let their boys to stand in for them at a dinner in his honour at which Huxley chided the university for failing to honour Darwin twenty years earlier. On the Sunday, after a "brilliant luncheon" with George at Trinity College, they were given guided tours. The engineering professor James Stuart showed Emma and Darwin round his workshop and later wrote of "A strong.. looking man with iron grey hair..[as though] rough hewn from a rock with a heavy..hammer,... A man of genius.. indeed one of 'the few'."

Darwin wrote to Hooker's wife thanking her for bananas sent from Kew, "such splendid ones that even a L.L.D. may be excused for enjoying them. There was a tremendous crowd & hooting & cheering at the Senate House yesterday, with a suspended monkey &c".

=== Romanes ===
Into the spring of 1878 Darwin and Frank again filled the house with experiments on the movement of plants. To Frank it was "as if an outside force were compelling him", and in March the strain brought back his old sickness of attacks of dizziness. Dr. Clark in London prescribed a "dry diet" which helped, and refused to charge his patient so Darwin sent £100 towards the development of a fungus-proof potato by a "highly respectable" Belfast breeder. He also responded to an appeal asking HMS Beagle's officers for help in supporting an orphan – the grandson of Jemmy Button.

George Romanes had become Darwin's leading protégé, but a conflict between his reasoned scepticism and earlier longing for faith came to a head when his sister died. His attempt to get solace from a leading spiritualist came to nothing. Darwin invited Romanes to Downe to help him recover. Romanes had earlier written a refutation of theism, and had taken Darwin's advice to pause, but now wanted to publish. Darwin counselled anonymity, and suggested study of the evolution of religious reasoning, giving him unused notes on instinct from his work on Natural Selection. Romanes launched on the study of comparative psychology, and in August was given a standing ovation for his talk at the British Association. In November the Darwins were staying with the Litchfields, and Romanes drove there to introduce his fiancé and present his new book, A Candid Examination of Theism by "Physicus". Darwin read it with "very great interest", but was unconvinced.

== Biography of Erasmus Darwin ==
The German scientific periodical Kosmos featured, as a 70th birthday tribute to Charles Darwin, an essay by Ernst Krause on his grandfather Erasmus Darwin. In March 1879 he arranged for it to be translated as a book to which he would add a biographical preface. This would counter Samuel Butler's Evolution Old and New in which the previously supportive, though unscientific, author of Erewhon had turned against Darwinism, and he sent a copy of it to Krause. In the summer he became bogged down with the proofs of his preface about Erasmus, and Henrietta edited out controversial points. The publisher John Murray was satisfied, but Darwin vowed "never again" to be "tempted out of my proper work".

=== Abominable mystery ===
The origin and swift diversification of flowering plants in the Early Cretaceous appeared to go against Darwin's view of gradual evolution, and in a July 1879 letter to Joseph Dalton Hooker he called this an "abominable mystery". He sought explanations such as a long earlier development having taken place in an area where the fossil record had been lost, possibly a sunken continent, or relatively rapid development having been spurred by coevolution between insects and plants.

Although he tired more quickly now, Darwin still worked for several hours a day. Emma ensured he took holidays, in autumn 1879 joining the Litchfields for a month in the Lake District where he met with John Ruskin, though this was not a meeting of minds. On return the Darwins were visited by Ernst Haeckel whose "roaring" about the freedom of science had Darwin retreating to his plants.

Darwin unsuccessfully tried to get government support for the Belfast potato breeder from the Permanent Secretary, Thomas "Theta" Farrer (Effie Wedgwood's husband). Farrer was more concerned that his daughter by his first marriage wanted to marry the unsuitable sickly Horace Darwin. Despite her father's opposition the young couple prevailed, with Darwin giving his son £5,000 of railway stock and assuring Farrer that Horace would have a suitable inheritance. The wedding took place on 3 January 1880, with the families not on speaking terms.

=== Samuel Butler ===
In Evolution Old and New Samuel Butler claimed that earlier evolutionists had correctly seen the mind as controlling evolution, and Mivart told Richard Owen that he thought the book would "help to burst the bubble of 'Natural Selection'." Ernst Krause's Erasmus Darwin countered this, and Butler took affront at Darwin's preface which said that Krause's essay predated Butler's book, when it clearly had passages written later. Darwin had to admit that Krause had revised his essay, and spent a week in February 1880 drafting responses, then was persuaded to ignore the dispute, writing to Huxley "I feel like a man condemned to be hung who has just got a reprieve". Butler took the silence as a tacit admission of guilt.

=== Coming of Age ===
Huxley titled his Royal Institution talk The Coming of Age of the Origin of Species, celebrating its 21st anniversary, though wrongly claiming that before its publication only catastrophism was accepted. While Darwin (on holiday with the Farrers, now on good terms) was delighted by the press coverage, he was disappointed to find no mention in its text of natural selection – even "Darwin's Bulldog" was still not committed to the central plank of his theory.

In April, Gladstone defeated the Tories at the general election, delighting Charles and Emma Darwin though not all their relatives, and a buoyant Charles sent a large subscription to Abbot's The Index with hearty wishes for success in the "good cause of truth" and 'free religion'. The Liberal success even got the militant atheist Charles Bradlaugh elected as MP for Northampton, and public controversy about atheism erupted. He was prevented from taking his seat in the House of Commons by procedural requirements of the oath of allegiance, and secularists such as Edward Aveling toured the country leading protests. Aveling had been writing a series on Darwin and his Works in Bradlaugh's paper The National Reformer, and Darwin had sent written thanks which he now feared would be published to his shame.

In June, after sending Movement in Plants to his publisher John Murray, Darwin visited William and Sarah at Southampton, and he got William to write to Abbot withdrawing the endorsement that had been printed as advertising copy in the magazine: even association with free thought in distant America could damage his respectability.

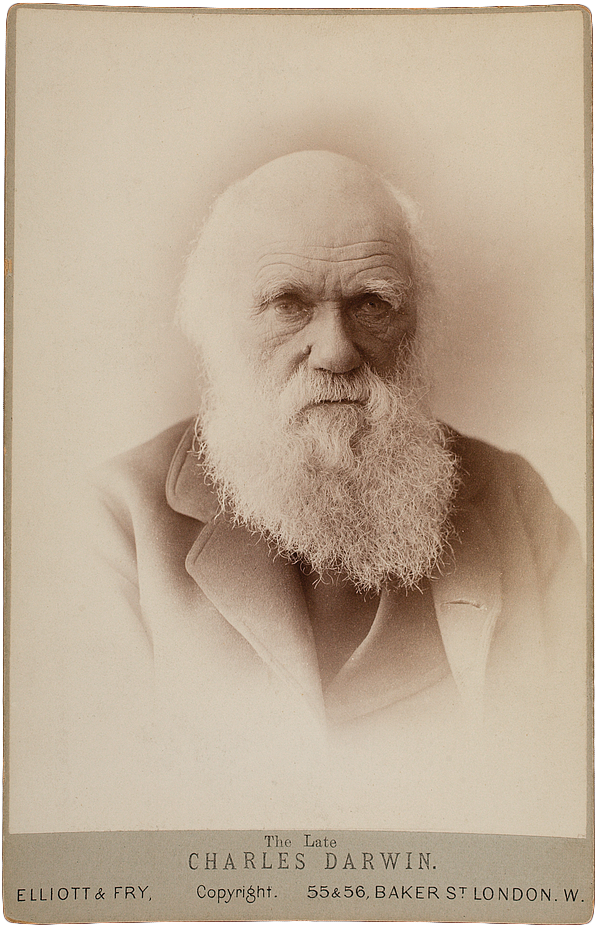
Darwin as photographed by Elliott & Fry

== Worms ==
Darwin again took up his work on worms. As ever, he corresponded widely, encouraging and helping fund research and collecting anecdotes. Emma supported his commitment, saying that "if it was a condition of his living, that he sh[oul]d do now work, she was willing for him to die". For their autumn break they visited Horace and Ida in Cambridge, and to spare him the stress of getting between London stations and changing trains Emma arranged a private railway carriage. At Cambridge he showed Emma around the "scenes of my early life".

In September 1880 he completed the proofs of Movement in Plants, his largest botany book at 600 pages with 196 wood-cuts, sighing "I am turned into a sort of machine for observing facts & grinding out conclusions." When on 13 October he got the request he had feared from Aveling, for permission to dedicate the Darwin and his Works articles to Darwin in book format, he declined in a four-page letter marked PRIVATE emphasising that he confined his writing to science and avoided aiding attacks on religion.

Attacks on Darwin's theory continued, and when the official report of a scientific voyage slighted "the theory which refers the evolution of species to extreme variation guided only by natural selection" he responded in Nature, "Can Sir Wyville Thomson name any one who has said that the evolution of species depends only on natural selection?" and set out multiple causes, including "use and disuse of parts". He called Thomson's criticism appropriate to "theologians and metaphysicians", and was only stopped by Huxley from using "irreverent language".

=== Help for Wallace ===
Wallace was suffering "ever-increasing anxiety" over funds, and Arabella Buckley, Lyell's old secretary, pleaded with Darwin to help him find "some modest work". Hooker persuaded Darwin it was hopeless, noting that Wallace had "lost caste" over spiritualism and a £500 bet he had won by proving the world was a globe to a rich flat-earth fanatic who then started litigation which cost Wallace more than the bet had won. When Wallace's "best book" to date, Island Life, came out in November 1880 Darwin devoted all his attention to getting his friends to sign a testimonial he wrote, then rushed it to Gladstone before the re-opening of Parliament at the start of January and was overjoyed when Gladstone agreed to recommend a civil list pension of £200 a year, backdated six months. As Darwin passed on the good news to Wallace, Emma organised the family accounts so that Charles could distribute the surplus from the year's £8,000 investment income to the children.

=== Work on worms ===
Downe was snowed in, and an outbreak of swine fever involved Darwin as magistrate signing orders daily to allow movement of stock. He wrote to Kovalevsky "I make sure, but wo[e]fully slow progress, with my new book" on worms. In late February he visited London, and called on Duke of Argyll, his old opponent. They had a long and "awfully friendly" discussion, and when Argyll asked if it was not "impossible to look at [the design of orchids] without seeing that they were the effect and the expression of Mind?", Darwin looked at him "very hard" before replying that he could see the "overwhelming force" this argument might have, but he could no longer accept it.

The billiard room at Down House was now devoted to worm experiments which included Darwin shining different colours of lights at them at night, his sons playing different musical instruments to them, different scents and kinds of food. Other stimuli were ignored, but a bright white light or a touch of breath would make them bolt "like rabbits" into their burrows. They appeared to "enjoy the pleasure of eating" showing "eagerness for certain kinds of food", sexual passion was "strong enough to overcome... their dread of light", and he saw "a trace of social feeling" in their way of "crawling over each other's bodies". Experiments showed that they dragged leaves into their burrows narrow end first, having somehow got a "notion, however rude, of the shape of an object", maybe by "touching it in many places" with a sense like "a man... born blind and deaf" and a rudimentary intelligence.

By mid march he was writing the final chapters of what he told Victor Carus would be "a small book of little moment. I have little strength & feel very old." He wrote to The Times about the anti-vivisection cause, accusing it of committing "a crime against humanity" by holding back the "progress of physiology", then commented that we "ought to be grateful" to worms, which reached a depth of "five or six feet" even "here at Down" where he expected to be buried shortly.

=== No heart or strength ===
Before Easter he sent off his manuscript for The Formation of Vegetable Mould through the Action of Worms, and found he had no "heart or strength... to begin any investigation lasting for years". "Never happy except when at work", he was at a loose end until he remembered his autobiography. On 22 April 1881, exactly 30 years after Annie's burial, he re-read the passages about her and Emma's letter of that time, and added a note under his daguerreotype of Annie, "When I am dead, know that many times, I have kissed & cryed over this." [sic.]

He left the proofs of Worms to Frank and, despondent, turned down Gladstone's invitation to become a Trustee of the British Museum. Early in June 1881 Emma and the Litchfields took him to the Lake District, together with William and young Bernard. The sky was "like lead" and an attempt at climbing brought spots before his eyes and a doctor's diagnosis that his heart condition was "precarious". He wrote to Hooker that "Illness is downright misery to me... I cannot forget my discomfort for an hour [and] must look forward to Down graveyard as the sweetest place on earth."

=== The Creed of Science ===
Then he was perked up by the 400-page The Creed of Science by the Irish philosopher William Graham arguing the validity of traditional beliefs in the face of materialism. Darwin wrote to Graham expressing doubts about the conclusions – "The chief one is that the existence of so-called natural laws implies purpose. I cannot see this." He was swayed by one – "You have expressed my inward conviction.. that the Universe is not the result of chance", but then qualified this by his "horrid doubt" that such beliefs might have arisen as the human mind evolved, and were no more to be trusted than "the convictions of a monkey's mind, if there are any convictions in such a mind". He still supported natural selection as the engine of social progress, pointing out that "The more civilised so-called Caucasian races have beaten the Turkish hollow in the struggle for existence" and telling Graham that elimination of "lower races" by "higher civilised races" was inevitable in the progress of Malthusian struggle.

Back at Downe, a letter from Wallace promoted the socialist ideas of Henry George's Progress and Poverty proposing to "make land common property" as morally just. The landowner Darwin responded that such books had "a disastrous effect" on his mind, he hoped that Wallace would not "turn renegade to natural history" while adding that "I have everything to make me happy and contented".

=== Pleasant memories ===
To Hooker he wrote of "Pleasant memories of long past days... many a discussion and... a good fight". Hooker valued their arguments "as iron sharpeneth iron" and, longing to "throw off the trammels of official life" and retire from Kew, found it "difficult to resist the pessimist view of creation", but "when I look back... to the days I have spent in intercourse with you and yours, that view takes wings to itself and flies away." That summer Darwin was in his "happiest spirits", chatting "deliciously" for hours and in the evenings asking for Bach and Handel to be played repeatedly. Romanes, visiting with his wife and baby, thought the old man as "grand and good and bright as ever".

Darwin stayed with Erasmus while his portrait was painted by John Collier and on 3 August dined by special invitation with the Prince of Wales, the Crown Prince of Germany and eminent physicians at the start of the Seventh International Medical Congress. Later, Erasmus became gravely ill and died on 26 August, and at the funeral at Downe on 1 September Charles, looking "old and ill", was a picture of "sad reverie". Subsequently, Darwin inherited half Erasmus's estate. William announced that this made Darwin's wealth over a quarter of a million pounds, "without mother's fortune", and Darwin redrafted his will. He sent a note to his sister Caroline about her half of Erasmus's estate, enclosing a miniature of their mother and commenting that he could not remember her face, though he did recall her "black velvet gown" and the "death scene".

A requested visit from the eminent but atheist German Doctor Ludwig Büchner in company with the notorious Edward Aveling went amiably on Thursday 28 September with Darwin introducing his old friend the Revd. Brodie Innes, and defending agnosticism (see Charles Darwin's views on religion).

Worms was published in October 1881 and within weeks thousands had been sold. It brought a flood of letters, with many "idiotic" enquiries, and a "worn out" Darwin escaped with Emma to visit Horace and Ida in Cambridge.

== Roots and illness ==
Darwin, "quite set up", returned to his experiments on plant roots standing in an ammonia solution, preparing sections and looking for "physiological division of labour" through his microscope.

In London he made an unannounced visit to the house of Romanes on 15 December. Romanes was absent, and Darwin declined the concerned butler's invitation to come in. He crossed the street, stumbled and clutched the railings before getting a cab. The next morning Dr. Clark pronounced him fine, but Emma kept him indoors and he was visited by eminent scientists. He seemed bright and animated, but told the geologist John Judd that he had "received his warning".

Once home, this did not hold him back from working hard at his root cells, as well as still doing his walks round the Sandwalk, receiving visitors and dealing with letters. In one he argued with an American feminist that women are "inferior intellectually". In February he was "miserable to a strange degree" with a cough. On 7 March 1882 he had a seizure while on the Sandwalk 400 yards from the house and struggled back to collapse in Emma's arms. Dr. Clark diagnosed angina and prescribed morphine pills for the pain. Darwin lay prostrate in despair, then a younger doctor, Dr. Norman Moore, assured him that his heart was only weak and within days Darwin was back at work, writing to Nature about beetles.

Having company helped. Henrietta brought her friend Laura Forster (aunt of E. M. Forster), herself making a rapid recovery from illness. Darwin daily told Laura of his symptoms and feelings. One day he came out into the garden and, putting his arms round Emma, said "Oh Laura, what a miserable man I should be without this dear woman." Another afternoon he joined her in the drawing-room and said "The clocks go dreadfully slowly, I have come in here to see if this one gets over the hours any quicker than the study one does."

Emma wanted a quiet Easter, so Laura and Henrietta left on 4 April, but on the 4th and 5th Darwin suffered attacks, noting "much pain". He recorded his own symptoms, and continued to note sporadic attacks. He took capsules of amyl nitrite, an antispasmodic, and was attended by Dr. Moore and a local physician, Dr. Allfrey.

On the 10th, George arrived back from the West Indies, and though Darwin was not up to talking for very long, he enjoyed George's news. Emma remembered how Darwin was "gracious & tender" when being attended for his illness, and would say "It is almost worth while to be so to be nursed by you".

George helped Frank and Jackson (the butler) to carry Darwin to and from his bed. On the nights of 11 and 12 April, Darwin had excruciating attacks of pain. On Saturday 15 April they were visited by the Lichfield family. Darwin joined them for dinner but had a giddy attack and fell down, and had to retire early. He did better on the Sunday, and on Monday was well enough to walk, supported on both sides, as far as the orchard.

== Death ==
Darwin seemed "fully up to the average, so on Tuesday 18 April the Lichfields left and George went to Cambridge. Darwin stayed up late later than usual in the evening, chatting to Bessy. Just before midnight he again had agonising pain, and woke a flustered Emma to ask for the amyl nitrite. She had difficulties finding it at first, and with the assistance of Bessy gave him brandy.

Emma later noted that he had woken her saying "I have got the pain & I shall feel better or bear it better if you are awake". He had taken the antispasmodic twice, and afterwards said "I am not the least afraid of death- Remember what a good wife you have been to me – Tell all my children to remember how good they have been to me".

Dr Allfrey attended and gave some relief, then after he left at 8 a.m. Charles began violent vomiting, after two hours gasping "If I could but die" repeatedly. Frank and Henrietta returned to join Bessy, who persuaded a worn out Emma to take an opium pill and rest. Charles woke in a daze, recognised his children and embraced them with tears. Emma's notes state that after the worse of the distress he said "I was so sorry for you – but I could not help you... there never were such good nurses as you [Francis] & Henrietta – Where is Mammy", and when told she was lying down, "I am glad of it... Don't call her I don't want her", and often "It's almost worth while to be sick to be nursed by you".

He suffered more bouts of nausea and pain, then at 3.25 p.m. groaned "I feel as if I should faint". Emma was called and held him as he suffered excruciating pain, then lost consciousness and died at 4 p.m. on Wednesday 19 April 1882. Dr Allfrey signed the death certificate which gave "Angina pectoris Syncope" as the cause of death.

Frank brought Bernard from the nursery to the garden. As they walked past the drawing-room window Bernard noticed his aunts and said "Why are Bessy and Etty crying? because Grandpa is so ill?" Grief-stricken, Frank eventually said "Grandpa has been so ill that he won't be ill any more." They reached the Sandwalk and Bernard gathered a bouquet of wild lilies.

=== Funeral ===
Arrangements were made for burial in St. Mary's churchyard at Downe, with Brodie Innes offering to perform the rites, and the customary black edged letters were sent out to friends, relatives and colleagues.

In London Galton got William Spottiswoode as President of the Royal Society to telegraph the Darwins asking if they would consent to burial in Westminster Abbey, an honour that Darwin had been glad to see given to Lyle in 1875. They told Hooker, Lubbock and Huxley who with Spottiswoode met the Revd. Frederic Farrar, Canon of Westminster. Farrar suggested a petition to overcome any objections to an agnostic being buried in the Abbey, and approached the Revd. George Granville Bradley, Dean of Westminster. Lubbock took up a petition in the House of Commons stating that "it would be acceptable to a very large number of our countrymen of all classes and opinions that our illustrious countryman Mr. Darwin should be buried in Westminster Abbey". It was "very influentially signed". Newspapers took the request up, sending a public plea to Emma and the children to consent, as foreign tributes poured in. The Standard maintained that "true Christians can accept the main scientific facts of Evolution just as they do of Astronomy and Geology", The Times declared the 1860 debate was "ancient history" and the Daily News said that Darwin's doctrine was consistent "with strong religious faith and hope".

Hurried arrangements were made, and Emma saw it "nearly settled. It gave us all a pang not to have him rest quietly by Eras – ; but William felt strongly, and on reflection I did also, that his gracious & grateful nature would have wished to accept the acknowledgement of what he had done". While her children and relatives attended the funeral, she stayed at Downe.

The Downe tradesmen were disappointed, the publican pointing out that it "would have helped the place so much, for it would have brought hosts of people down to see his grave". The joiner had "made his coffin just the way he wanted it, all rough, just as it left the bench, no polish, no nothin", but this was returned and replaced by one "you could see to shave in". He added that "They buried him in Westminster Abbey, but he always wanted to lie here, and I don't think he'd have liked it."

That Sunday, Church sermons praised Darwin, saying Natural Selection was "by no means alien to the Christian tradition" (if interpreted correctly) and seeking a "reconciliation between Faith and Science". On Tuesday there was a massive demand for admission cards to the funeral.

All day on Tuesday the hearse was drawn by four horses the 16 miles from Downe to Westminster in cold drizzling rain. Next morning the Abbey filled with mourners including international dignitaries and scientists. At midday on Wednesday 26 April 1882 the full pomp of a state occasion began.

The service included a specially commissioned anthem setting words from the Book of Proverbs to music composed for the occasion by Frederick Bridge, "Happy is the man that findeth wisdom, and getteth understanding". As the Darwin family later recalled, William "was sitting in the front seat as eldest son and chief mourner, and he felt a draught on his already bald head; so he put his black gloves to balance on the top of his skull, and sat like that all through the service with the eyes of the nation upon him". Darwin was buried beneath the monument to Isaac Newton, next to Sir John Herschel, and as the coffin was lowered, the choir sang an anthem from Ecclesiasticus to music by Handel, "His body is buried in peace, but his name liveth evermore".

Pallbearers at the funeral included: William Cavendish, 7th Duke of Devonshire; George John Douglas Campbell, 8th Duke of Argyll; Edward Henry Stanley, 15th Earl of Derby; James Russell Lowell; William Spottiswoode; Joseph Dalton Hooker; Alfred Russel Wallace; Thomas Henry Huxley; John Lubbock, 1st Baron Avebury; and last but by no means least Rev. Frederic Farrar; Stanley and Farrar were both Cambridge Apostles as Erasmus Alvey 'Ras' Darwin had been; Charles Darwin himself had not been a member of the Cambridge Apostles.

The service was conducted by Canon George Prothero (1818–1894), since the Dean, George Granville Bradley, was not in the country at the time. The other Westminster Abbey staff present were minor canon Rev. John Henry Cheadle (? – ?); minor canon Rev. John Troutbeck (1832–1899); Canon Thomas James Rowsell (1816–1894); Canon Alfred Barry (1826–1910); Canon Robinson Duckworth (1834–1911); Rev. Samuel Flood Jones, precentor, (1826–1895); the Chapter Clerk, Charles St. Clare Bedford (1810–1900); and Frederick Bridge, organist (1844–1924) (according to The Times, he composed an anthem for the funeral).

=== Commemoration ===
Galton proposed a commemorative stained glass window in the Abbey, with panels symbolising the works of nature, each contributed by a different country. The evolution pane did not proceed, but the Royal Society formed a committee which decided on a bronze plaque in the Abbey, and a statue for the new Natural History Museum at South Kensington. Richard Owen remained opposed, and unveiling of the statue had to wait till 1885, after his retirement. The pomp and ceremony was attended by the Prince of Wales, scientists and the family, though not Emma, and led by Huxley.

Darwin's Westminster Abbey funeral expressed a public feeling of national pride, with the Pall Mall Gazette proclaiming that Great Britain had "lost a man whose name is a glory to his country". Religious writers of all persuasions praised his "noble character and his ardent pursuit of truth", calling him a "true Christian gentleman". In particular the Unitarians and free religionists, proud of his Dissenting upbringing, supported his naturalistic views. William Benjamin Carpenter carried a resolution praising Darwin's unravelling of "the immutable laws of the Divine Government", shedding light on "the progress of humanity". The Unitarian preacher John Chadwick from New York wrote that "The nation's grandest temple of religion opened its gates and lifted up its everlasting doors and bade the King of Science come in."
