= Darwin from Descent of Man to Emotions =

Between 1868 and 1872, the life and work of Charles Darwin from Descent of Man to Emotions continued with aspects of his intended "Big Book" on evolution through natural selection. He had by then hurriedly published an "abstract" of this work as On the Origin of Species in 1859, and following the immediate reaction to Darwin's theory his earlier work included demonstrating the utility of the flowers of Orchids in directing insect pollination to achieve cross fertilisation, and a summing up of thirteen years of experiments in The Variation of Animals and Plants Under Domestication which went on sale on 30 January 1868. He now published his ideas on human evolution and on how beautiful but apparently impractical features could have evolved in The Descent of Man, and Selection in Relation to Sex. After revising The Origin of Species as the definitive 6th edition, his major works on species culminated in The Expression of the Emotions in Man and Animals. This period was followed by extensive work on insectivorous plants and research into worms.

== Family and research ==
Despite Darwin's concerns that his children were weakened as his wife Emma Darwin was his cousin or had inherited his own illness, around early 1868 his sons had successes with William Darwin doing well as a bank manager, Leonard Darwin coming second in the entrance exam for the Royal Military Academy and George coming runner-up in his mathematics degree class at the University of Cambridge, getting offered a science mastership at Eton College but choosing to make his career in law.

=== Sexual selection ===
Darwin turned his attention to sexual selection, writing to scientist friends for information. He got commercial breeders to experiment with altering the appearance of their stock and recording the subject's sexual prowess. He thought that exotic creatures like hummingbirds and peacocks owed their appearance, not to divine design to please man, but to the cumulative effect of the female preferring minute differences in choosing a mate, writing that "A girl sees a handsome man, and without observing whether his nose or whiskers are the tenth of an inch longer or shorter than in some other man, admires his appearance and says she will marry him. So, I suppose, with the pea-hen."

To meet a lack of books supporting the Origin on natural selection, Darwin arranged with John Murray to publish a translation of Für Darwin, written by Fritz Müller exiled in Brazil. Darwin provided £100 subsidy and arranged the translator, and Facts and Arguments for Darwin. sold well.

In the spring of 1868 Darwin got information on newts from St George Mivart, a brilliant anatomist and one of Huxley's protégés who had dropped law for zoology after hearing Owen lecture. He assured Darwin that "As to "natural selection" I accepted it completely" but added that he had "doubts & difficulties.. first excited by attending Prof. Huxley's lectures".

== The Descent of Man ==
The book The Reign of Law by the Duke of Argyll argued that beauty with no obvious utility, such as exotic birds' plumage, proved divine design. Darwin had to show how this was explained by his theory of sexual selection, and was now working to include this with ape ancestry and evolution of morality and religion in a new book which he now decided to call The Descent of Man.

=== Sources ===
Darwin found many ideas in the quality magazines. Wallace argued that group co-operation increased fitness for survival. Darwin's cousin Francis Galton wrote Hereditary Talent and Character for Macmillan's Magazine emphasising the inheritance of traits, and their extension to races and classes, and calling for better breeding to ensure that the "nobler varieties of mankind" prevailed, with civilisation being saved from "intellectual anarchy" by scientific "master minds" rising to power. These views were shared by Darwin's old friend W. R. Greg whose Fraser's Magazine article about natural selection in society raised fears of the "unfit" and of the prudent middle classes being out-bred by the idle rich and the feckless poor.

These ideas raised a dilemma, of evolution working against progress. Darwin found help in Walter Bagehot's essays on Physics and Politics in the Fortnightly Review which argued that progress depended on the command structure of society. Civilisation came from obedience, respect for law and a "military bond". Through tribal and imperial battles new racial and national types would emerge, selected as "The characters which do win in war are the characters which we should wish to win in war". Darwin added his comment "nations which wander & cross would be most likely to vary" in the face of wider competition, and commended to Hooker Bagehot's analysis of "prehistoric politics".

=== British Association ===
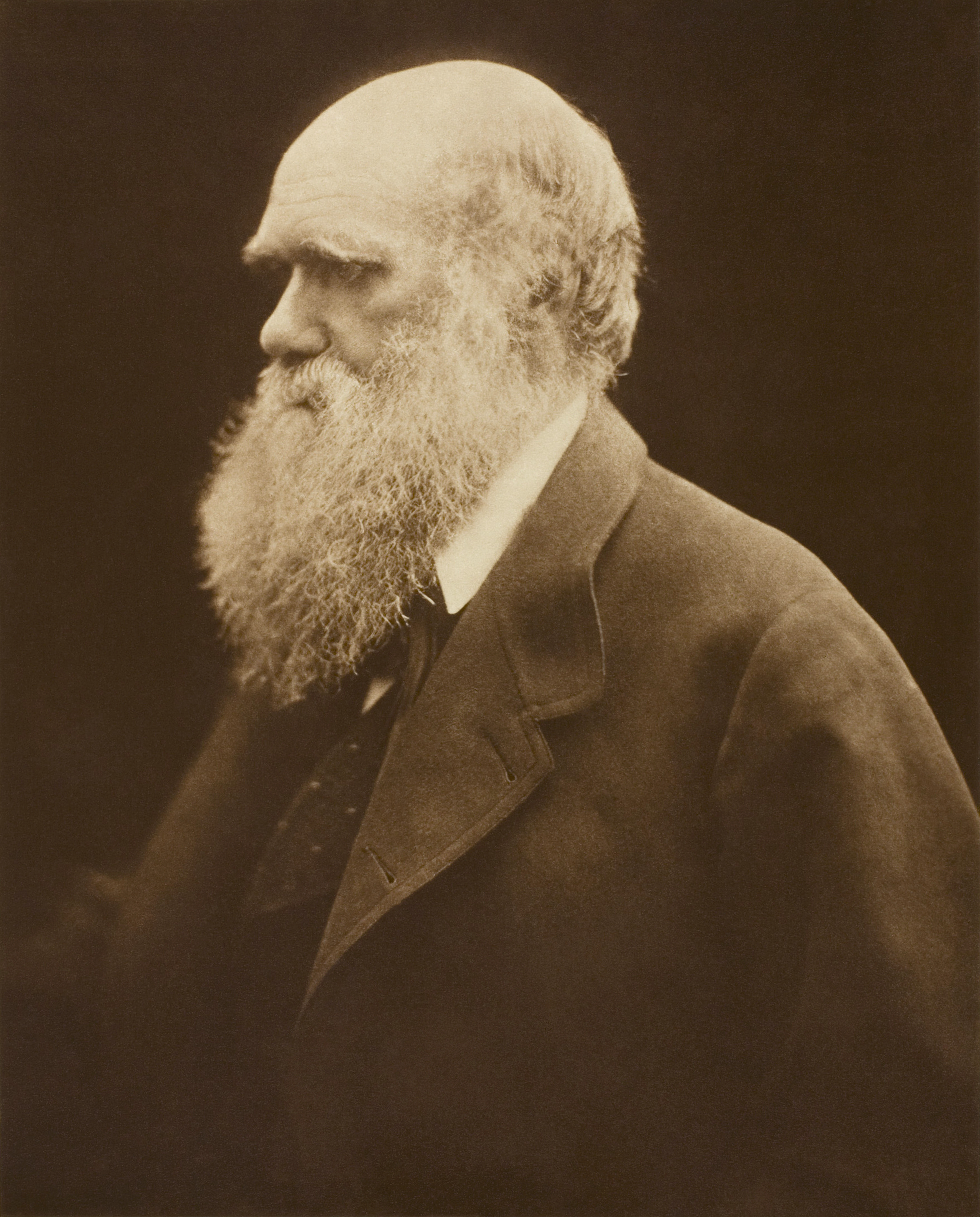
Julia Margaret Cameron's 1868 portrait shows the beard Darwin began growing during illness in July 1862, which became so bushy that he had to reintroduce himself to friends in April 1866.

Hooker became the first Darwinian to become president of the British Association for the Advancement of Science. While Hooker was working on his initial address, Darwin with his wife Emma and daughter Henrietta went on holiday to the Isle of Wight on 16 July 1868, and rented a cottage from the photographer Julia Margaret Cameron who took Darwin's portrait. Hooker joined them and the Irish poet William Allingham described "Dr. Hooker in lower room writing away at his Address... Upstairs Mrs. Darwin, Miss D. and Mr. Charles Darwin himself–, yellow, sickly, very quiet. He has his meals at his own times, sees people or not as he chooses, has invalid's privileges in full, a great help to a studious man."

Hooker's address to the Norwich British Association was a great success for the X Club (a dining club formed in November 1864 to support the evolutionary "new reformation" in naturalism, including Huxley, Hooker, John Tyndall, Busk, Spencer, and Spottiswoode). Darwin arrived home on 21 August with a clutch of the day's newspapers carrying the address and editorial comments. The Guardian said Darwinism's "reign was triumphant", and it was generally said that the disciples were "ready to push their consequences more fearlessly than the master himself". Darwin enjoyed John Tyndall's lecture in which the physicist widened the application of his theory.

Ernst Haeckel's Darwinismus was even more universal, incorporating life, mind, society, politics and knowledge itself, though Darwin had struggled with reading his book and his efforts to get it translated were thwarted as the book proved too controversial. Haeckel, the "indomitable worker", quickly produced his History of Creation. An impressed Huxley adopted Haeckel's approach, and did what he had told Darwin was impossible and wrong, drawing up a genealogical tree for the ancestry of partridges and pigeons which traced them back to the dinosaurs. Huxley also arranged audiences for Germans arriving to pay their "devotions at the shrine of Mr. Darwin".

That autumn, the botanist Asa Gray came to England with his wife for a long rest from "drudgery" at Harvard. He spent the time with Hooker at Kew, visiting the Darwins at weekends. There were many other visitors at this time, including Gray's friend Charles Eliot Norton who brought his wife and her sister Sara Sedgwick, who caught William Darwin's eye. Gray was theologically uncomfortable with the implications of Variation, and returned home wanting to avoid further "Darwinian discussions" or become "mixed up" with the Huxley set.

=== Parish affairs ===
Ever since moving to Downe, Darwin had supported the parish church's work and had been a friend of the Revd. John Innes since he had taken over in 1846. Darwin continued to help, though he stopped attending church after his daughter Annie died in 1851. By 1864 Innes had retired to a property he had inherited in the Scottish Highlands, changing his name to Brodie Innes and leaving the parish in the dubious hands of his curate, the Revd. Stevens, while still remaining the patron. The meagre "living" and lack of a vicarage made it hard to attract a priest of quality. Innes made Darwin treasurer of Downe village school and they continued to correspond, with Innes seeking help and advice on parish matters. The Revd. Stevens proved lax, and departed in 1867. His successors were worse, one absconding with the school's funds after Darwin mistakenly shared the treasurer's duties with him. The next was rumoured to have disgraced himself by "walking with girls at night". Darwin now became involved in helping Innes with detective work, subsequently advising him that the gossip that had reached Innes was not backed up by any reliable evidence.

=== Thomson and Mivart ===
Concerned about Thomson's calculations giving a young age for the Earth, Darwin asked his mathematical son George to check the figures, disbelieving the "brevity of the world... else my views would be wrong, which is impossible – Q.E.D.". Darwin modified the 5th edition of the Origin, speeding up the process of variation and reviving the Lamarckian "useful inheritance" notion. In February 1869 Huxley at the Geological Society argued that '" Biology takes her time from geology...[even] if the geological clock is wrong, all the naturalist will have to do is to modify his notions of the rapidity of change accordingly".

Huxley was charged with heresy after giving a Sunday "lay sermon" in Edinburgh "on the physical basis of life". In April the "Metaphysical Society", a group of liberal churchmen of all denominations and even atheists, attempted to reach a consensus and Huxley coined a new label for his position – agnostic. Wallace was now arguing that human brains were an over-endowment created by "spiritual forces" rather than natural selection, leading Darwin to write "I differ grievously from you, and I am very sorry for it".

Mivart gained his Fellowship of the Royal Society on 3 June with Huxley's help, then surprised him by announcing that he was going to publish his objections to Darwinian views of human nature and morality. Mivart placed anonymous articles criticising natural selection in the Catholic Month. The Duke of Argyll published his Primeval Man arguing that man could not rise unaided from "utter barbarism", and that "savages" were degenerates forced out by fitter races. Argyll claimed that "Man must have had the human proportions of mind before he could afford to lose bestial proportions of body", contrasting a gorilla with an elder of the British Association, but Darwin noted that without remains of ancestors there was no evidence for this, and that man's vulnerability would have encouraged social cohesion and moral sense.

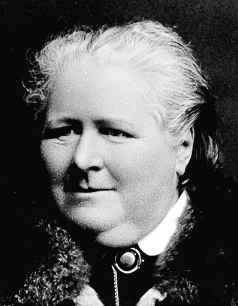
Darwin sought to trump Frances Power Cobbe by writing in the Descent of Man that though women tended to be more intuitive, this was shared by less advanced peoples.

=== Holiday in Wales ===
On 10 June "his ladies" took Darwin away on holiday to Caerdon in the Barmouth valley, but he was depressed to be barely able to walk half a mile. On one walk the feminist Frances Power Cobbe caught up with him and tried to persuade him that John Stuart Mill's 1869 book The Subjection of Women was an ideal source for his study of man's origins and sexual selection. When Darwin, who had read Cobbe's review of Mill, answered that Mill '"could learn some things" from biology, and that the "struggle for existence" produced man's special "vigour and courage" from battling "for the possession of women", she offered him a copy of Kant on the "moral sense" to sort out his ethical problems, but he declined. He did ask his son William to read Mill and tell him what to think. On 16 July, Darwin started to work out a strategy to "trump" Cobbe, and wrote down his notes that men were superior to women because they had been "defending the tribe & hunting" for many generations and that Mill didn't think of sexual selection. When he returned home, Darwin added his notes to Descent, commenting that women seemed to show "greater tenderness and less selfishness", suggesting that this came from maternal instincts in contrast to male competitiveness. He wrote that "It is generally admitted that with woman the powers of intuition, of rapid perception, and perhaps of imitation, are more strongly marked than in man; but some, at least, of these faculties are characteristic of the lower races, and therefore of a past and lower state of civilisation." His views supported Victorian stereotypes.

In November the founding of Nature gave the X Club an outlet for their views. As well as Hooker and Huxley, it featured Darwin's cousin Francis Galton.

=== Editing and translation ===
Darwin continued to slog away at the Descent of Man, feeling "as dull as a duck". He dreaded publication, telling Mivart that "I can see that I shall meet with universal disapprobation, if not execution". As he wrote, he posted chapters to his daughter Henrietta at Cannes, for editing to ensure that damaging inferences could not be drawn. He thought he was getting rather evangelical, writing "Who would ever have thought I should turn parson!"

Emma also advised, writing that the treatment of morals and religion might be "very interesting", but she would still "dislike it very much as again putting God further off". They took a break in mid May 1870 along with Henrietta and Bessy to visit Cambridge where Horace had started and Frank was graduating with a good mathematics degree. Charles was haunted by the absence of "Dear Henslow", but on the last day met Sedgwick who was overjoyed to see him with his "dear family party". They had a long chat, with Sedgwick not mentioning the Origin, possibly from tact though Darwin thought his brain "enfeebled". Late in the day Sedgwick insisted on showing Charles round his new geological museum, by the end of which Darwin was "utterly prostrated". As Darwin on struggled to get to the train the next day he remarked on the humiliation of being "thus killed by a man of eighty-six, who evidently never dreamed that he was thus killing me?".

The South American Missionary Society had converted and clothed the natives of Tierra del Fuego that Darwin thought were untameable, and after Bartholomew Sulivan sent a photograph of Jemmy Button's son as evidence, Darwin made donations for several years. Darwin was proud to become an honorary member, but warned Sulivan that he would shortly publish "another book partly on man, which I dare say many will decry as very wicked".

Darwin's neighbour Lubbock had been elected Member of Parliament for Maidstone in February 1870 and Darwin lobbied him to get a question added to the census to find if married cousins had as many surviving children as unrelated parents, but when it came up in July, Lubbock's amendment caused furious debate and was heavily defeated. As the Franco-Prussian War got under way, Darwin pressed on to finish the manuscript while worrying about how it would affect his German allies. When the French surrendered at Sedan in November he wrote that "I have not met a soul in England who does not rejoice in the splendid triumph of Germany over France... It is a most just retribution against that vainglorious, war-liking nation." An "ailing and grumbling" Darwin worked on with his corrections, and the proofs were sent off on 15 January 1871 with him doubting that the book was "worth publishing". He promptly started on his next book, using left over material on emotional expressions.

=== Mivart's Genesis ===
Within a week Mivart had published On the Genesis of Species, the cleverest and most devastating critique of natural selection in Darwin's lifetime. Mivart wrote expressing "sympathy and esteem" for Darwin, blaming "irreligious deductions" on overzealous supporters and adding "God grant that we in England may not be approaching a religious decay at all similar to that of the middle of the 18th century in France which Frenchmen are now paying for in blood & tears!" As Paris suffered under siege, Darwin sent out review copies of his book, expecting a backlash.

Just at this point parish affairs intruded. The Revd. Henry Powell had now taken over, but the two previous curates got together to sue Darwin for defamatory remarks about the first absconding with the school's cash. Darwin wrote to Brodie Innes that "being examined in court could half-kill me", but was assured that the case would never come to court.

=== Publication ===
A caricature in The Hornet satirical magazine dated 22 March 1871 was typical of many portraying Darwin with an ape body, identifying him in popular culture as the leading author of evolutionary theory and helping to identify all forms of evolutionism with Darwinism.

The two 450-page volumes of The Descent of Man, and Selection in Relation to Sex went on sale at twenty-four shillings, with a publication date of 24 February 1871. Within three weeks a reprint had been ordered, and 4,500 copies were in print by the end of March 1871, netting Darwin almost £1,500. Darwin's name created demand for the book, but the ideas were old news. "Everybody is talking about it without being shocked" which he found "proof of the increasing liberality of England". To critics, the book was "raising a storm of mingled wrath, wonder and admiration", though they denied that "spiritual powers" had evolved from brutes in case earnest men gave up "those motives by which they have attempted to live noble and virtuous lives".

The Prussians had been defeated, but 26 March an insurrection led by socialists and republicans took over Paris and set up the Paris Commune, which was then besieged by French troops. The Times condemned the Communards, and accused Darwin of undermining authority and principles of morality, opening the way to "the most murderous revolutions". A "man incurs a grave responsibility when, with the authority of a well-earned reputation, he advances at such a time the disintegrating speculations of this book." Darwin was able to shrug this off as from a "windbag full of metaphysics and classics". When his Tory friend Brodie Innes taunted him that God's scheme, before being thwarted by interfering radicals, was that "Man was made a man..[split] into niggers who must be made to work [and] better men able to make them", Darwin responded that "I consider myself a good way ahead of you, as far as this goes."

He dismissed the objections raised in Wallace's review in the Academy as "almost stereotyped", but to his brother Erasmus Alvey Darwin the generous and polite exchanges formed a "perfectly beautiful" controversy, and thought that "In future histories of science the Wallace-Darwin episode will form one of the few bright points."

== 6th Edition of the Origin ==
Mivart wrote wishing "with all my heart that we did not differ so widely", but challenging Darwin to debate the basic metaphysics underlying science, from his Roman Catholic position writing that "while combatting (as duty compels me to do) positions you adopt, I am not so much combatting you as others to whose view your scientific labours give additional currency." Darwin took this personally, feeling that Mivart's Genesis of Species was "producing a great effect against Natural Selection, and more especially against me." After completing a rough draft of Expressions in April 1871 he set it aside and turned to revising the Origin to meet Mivart's arguments and counter the claim that some divine inner force was driving evolution. Darwin told Murray of working men in Lancashire clubbing together to buy the 5th edition at fifteen shillings, and he wanted a new cheap edition to make it more widely available.

In June Edward L. Youmans, over from the United States to seek authors for his International Scientific Series, told Darwin about lecturing on the Descent of Man to a "clerical club" in Brooklyn. Darwin burst out "What! Clergymen of different denominations all together? How they would fight if you should get them together here!" He was cheered by a damning analysis of Mivart's Genesis of Species by Chauncey Wright (one of Gray's students) for the North American Review, and thought of importing it, but Wallace thought it too heavy and obscure.

Next Mivart's anonymous Quarterly Review article claimed that the Descent of Man would unsettle "our half educated classes" and talked of people doing as they pleased, breaking laws and customs. The author was obvious to a furious Darwin who thought "I shall soon be viewed as the most despicable of men". He wrote to ask Wright for permission to reprint his article as a pamphlet, then feeling "giddy and bad" was taken by Emma to recuperate at the nearby hamlet of Albury. His head remained "rocky and wretched" and for two months he suffered giddiness and inability to work. They returned for Henrietta's marriage after a whirlwind courtship to Richard Litchfield. She departed, leaving behind her Fox Terrier "Polly" who now became Darwin's dog.

Murray sent out copies of Wright's pamphlet in September 1871. Only fourteen sold, but by then Huxley had already written a cutting review of Mivart's book and article. A relieved Darwin told him "How you do smash Mivart's theology... He may write his worst & he will never mortify me again". Hooker thought he surely would not be the happier for Mivart's humiliation, but an unrepentant Darwin responded that '"I am not so good a Christian as you think me, for I did enjoy my revenge".

In December Darwin completed extensive revisions of the Origin, using the word "evolution" for the first time and adding a new chapter to refute Mivart's guided jumps, tackling the argument of uselessness of part-evolved organs with myriad examples of gradual development or organs changing function. As 1872 began, Mivart politely inflamed the argument again, writing "wishing you very sincerely a happy new year" while wanting a disclaimer of the "fundamental intellectual errors" in the Descent of Man. This time Darwin ended the correspondence.

=== The Index ===
Darwin reacted positively to a tract by the American Francis Abbott proposing "the extinction of faith in the Christian Confession" and a new humanist "Free Religion" for the "spiritual perfection of the individual and the spiritual unity of the race". He subscribed to Abbott's weekly The Index and allowed it to print his endorsement of the tract's "truths", "I admire them from my inmost heart & I agree to almost every word".

=== Publication ===
Darwin told Haeckel "I doubt whether my strength will last for much more serious work. I shall continue to work for as long as I can, but it does not much signify when I stop, as there are so many good men fully as capable, perhaps more capable than myself, of carrying on our work; and of these you rank as the first." With "the little strength left in me" he reopened his enquiries into earthworms, requesting information from correspondents.

The 6th edition of Origin of Species was published by Murray on 19 February 1872 at a price kept down to 7s. 6d. by using minute print, and sales increased from 60 to 250 a month.

== Emotions ==
Through the spring Darwin pressed on with The Expression of the Emotions in Man and Animals, pointing to shared evolution in contrast to Charles Bell's Anatomy and Physiology of Expression which claimed divinely created muscles to express man's exquisite feelings. Darwin drew on worldwide responses to his questionnaires, hundreds of photographs of actors, babies and "imbeciles" in an asylum, as well as his own observations, with particular empathy for the grief following a family death. The proofs, tackled by Henrietta and Leo, needed major revision which made him "sick of the subject, and myself, and the world". It was to be one of the first books with photographs, with seven heliotype plates, and Murray warned that this "would poke a terrible hole in the profits".

In May 1872 Darwin became a foreign member of the Royal Netherlands Academy of Arts and Sciences.

Wallace wrote in August, enthusing about H. Charlton Bastian's The Beginnings of Life claiming the spontaneous generation of life, but Darwin told him that "I have taken up old botanical work, and have given up all theories". By the end of September he was again near collapse, but Emma arranged three weeks away to rest, which worked well though he was still "growing old and weak".

Hooker's collections at Kew were threatened with government cuts under Acton Smee Ayrton. The X Club petitioned Gladstone. When Richard Owen was found to be involved, possibly trying to bring Kew under his British Museum, Darwin commented that "I used to be ashamed of hating him so much, but now I will carefully cherish my hatred & contempt to the last days of my life". In October Hooker sent sun-dews and Venus fly-traps for Darwin's experiments, then was devastated when his bedridden mother died. In his hot-house Darwin experimented, giving such plants from around the world a variety of foods and poisons, and began writing insectivorous Plants.

The Expression of the Emotions in Man and Animals proved very popular, selling over 5,000 copies, but an exhausted Darwin became a "confirmed invalid" and at his brother Eramus's over Christmas 1872 sat drawing up his will.

== New edition of The Descent of Man ==
Darwin recovered and pressed on with several projects. He subsequently tackled a new edition of the Descent of Man, incorporating ideas from Galton and new anecdotes. The manuscript was completed in April 1874, and the new edition was published on 13 November. In the new edition, Darwin withdrew the explanation he offered in the first edition of how natural selection leads to an even sex ratio - that is, to equal numbers of males and females at reproductive age. Darwin does not explain why he changed his mind.

Darwin continued his work following this period.
