= Darwin from Orchids to Variation =

Life and work of Charles Darwin from Orchids to Variation

Between 1860 and 1868, the life and work of Charles Darwin from Orchids to Variation continued with research and experimentation on evolution, carrying out tedious work to provide evidence of the extent of natural variation enabling artificial selection. He was repeatedly held up by his illness, and continued to find relaxation and interest in the study of plants. His studies of insect pollination led to publication of his book Fertilisation of Orchids as his first detailed demonstration of the power of natural selection, explaining the complex ecological relationships and making testable predictions. As his health declined, he lay on his sickbed in a room filled with inventive experiments to trace the movements of climbing plants.

Darwinism became a movement covering a wide range of evolutionary ideas. In 1863 Lyell's Geological Evidences of the Antiquity of Man popularised prehistory, though his caution on evolution disappointed Darwin. Weeks later Huxley's Evidence as to Man's Place in Nature showed that anatomically, humans are apes, then The Naturalist on the River Amazons by Henry Walter Bates provided empirical evidence of natural selection. Lobbying brought Darwin Britain's highest scientific honour, the Royal Society's Copley Medal, awarded on 3 November 1864. That day, Huxley held the first meeting of what became the influential X Club devoted to "science, pure and free, untrammelled by religious dogmas".

Admiring visitors included Ernst Haeckel, a zealous follower of "Darwinismus" in a translation favouring progressive evolution over natural selection. Wallace remained supportive, though he increasingly turned to Spiritualism.

The first part of Darwin's planned "big book", The Variation of Animals and Plants Under Domestication, grew to two huge volumes, forcing him to leave out human evolution and sexual selection. It sold briskly in 1868 despite its size, and was translated into many languages. Darwin's work on the Descent of Man and Emotions followed after this publication.

== Background ==
Darwin's ideas developed rapidly from the return in 1836 of The Voyage of the Beagle. By December 1838 he had developed the principles of his theory, but was conscious of the need to answer all likely objections before publishing. While he continued with research, he had an immense amount of work in hand analysing and publishing findings from the Beagle expedition, and was repeatedly delayed by illness.

Natural history at that time was dominated by clerical naturalists, whose income came from the Established Church of England, and who saw their science as revealing God's plan. Darwin found two close allies: the young botanist Joseph Dalton Hooker and the ambitious naturalist Thomas Huxley who lacked the family wealth or contacts to find a career and joined a progressive group looking to make science a profession, freed from the clerics. Darwin's correspondent Wallace arrived independently at his own version of the theory, which brought an early announcement of the theory and the publication of On the Origin of Species through Natural Selection in 1859.

This brought a storm of argument. Many naturalists attacked what they saw as an assault on established beliefs about the natural world, and perhaps the ideological foundations of the British social order, while liberal theologians and a new generation of scientists welcomed the theory. Charles Lyell and Hooker, as well as Asa Gray in America, gave support despite difficulty in coming to terms with natural selection and man's descent from animals. Huxley's interest in aggressively attacking the scientific establishment earned him the moniker "Darwin's bulldog" in a ferocious dispute with the leading anatomist Richard Owen as to whether the anatomy of brain structure was consistent with humans and apes having shared ancestry. The campaign was devastatingly successful for the Darwinian cause and brought new recruits.

== Ape-men ==
Lyell was troubled both by Huxley's belligerence and by the question of ape ancestry, but got little sympathy from Darwin who teased him in January 1860: "Our ancestor was an animal which breathed water, had a swim-bladder, a great swimming tail, an imperfect skull & undoubtedly was an hermaphrodite! Here is a pleasant genealogy for mankind." In April Lyell noted thoughts on humanity, and Darwin commented that "to me it would be an infinite satisfaction to believe that mankind will progress to such a pitch, that we shd. be looked back at as mere Barbarians." Huxley was busy attacking the old theory of divine providence as "anthropomorphism" and promoting the new Darwinian orthodoxy of "the passionless impersonality of the unknown and unknowable". He told Lyell that the range of brain sizes between people was greater than the difference between small-brained people and gorillas, and "Under these circumstances it would certainly be well to let go the head (as a way of distinguishing species) though I am afraid it does not mend matters much to lay hold of the foot."

Lyell began work on a book examining human origins. He toured archaeological sites in Britain and France, examining such evidence as the pre-glacial stone scrapers Hugh Falconer had found in a cave at Brixham in Devon in 1858 and flint tools in a Bedford, Bedfordshire, gravel pit. After touring the Abbeville flint site in France in 1859, Lyell announced that he had overcome thirty years of denial of such antiquity and accepted that ancient man pre-dated the ice age. A delighted Darwin responded in April 1861 "It is grand. What a fine long pedigree you have given the Human Race!" Lyell questioned Huxley about the Neanderthal fossil found near Düsseldorf and described by Hermann Schaaffhausen in 1858 which Huxley examined at the College of Surgeons in London. Lyell still, however, remained deeply critical of Darwin's idea of natural selection.

In the spring of 1861 John Stevens Henslow, the botany professor whose natural history course Charles had joined thirty years earlier who was also Hooker's father-in-law, lay dying of heart disease. Darwin's own health was precarious, and he had recently suffered 24 hours of vomiting after the excitement of a few minutes of speaking at the Linnean Society. He agonised about visiting the man who had made the Beagle trip possible and had given him much support since, and on 23 April told Hooker that "the agitation would cause me probably to arrive utterly prostrated." He had "never felt my weakness a greater evil." Henslow died on 18 May.

Darwin was well into his work on domestication, obtaining skeletons of fowl and animals, borrowing specimens or stewing pigeons he had bred and rabbits he had requested, "I want it dead for the skeleton, not knocked on the head". This would eventually lead to his book The Variation of Animals and Plants Under Domestication.

He continued to suffer from illness and worries about the health of his children, and felt "incessant anxiety" about his daughter Henrietta. She had suffered a typhoid infection the previous month, and was an invalid at only 18, close to death and needing three attendants round the clock. Emma Darwin was used to nursing, but was at her wit's end: "I have succeeded pretty well in teaching myself not to give way to despondency, [but can] only live from day to day." She wrote another touching letter to Charles, saying the "only relief [was to take] affliction as from God's hand [and] try to believe that all suffering & illness is meant to help us to exalt our minds & look forward with hope to a future state... When I see your patience, deep compassion for others, self command & above all gratitude for the smallest thing done to help you I cannot help longing that these precious feelings should be offered to Heaven for the sake of your daily happiness... It is feeling & not reasoning that drives one to prayer." Charles wrote "God Bless you" at the bottom of the note.

Lyell attended Huxley's continuing working-men's lectures, and was "astonished at the attentiveness and magnitude of the audience...[who would] devour any amount of your anthropoid ape questions". Human origins had been taboo to the scientific élite, but had long been featured in the radical press and the secularist Reasoner was currently running a series about evolution to combat "Theological Theories of the Origin of Man" with information about human fossils and Darwin's book. Huxley was tailoring his lectures to bring Darwinism to this wider constituency, saying that "Brought face to face [with chimpanzees or apes] these blurred copies of himself, the least thoughtful of men is conscious of a certain shock... It is as if Nature herself has foreseen the arrogance of man, and with Roman severity had provided that his intellect by its very triumphs, should call into prominence the slaves, admonishing the conqueror that he is but dust." Man might have come from the brutes, but "he is assuredly not of them... [man is not] degraded from his high estate [by descent from a] bestial savage,... [but] once escaped from the blinding influences of traditional prejudice, will find in the lowly stock whence Man has sprung, the best evidence of the splendour of his capacities; and will discern in his long progress through the Past, a reasonable ground of faith in his attainment of a nobler future." This was Darwinism supporting the creed of working class self-improvement.

== Orchids ==
For July and August 1861 they took their daughter Henrietta to the seaside village of Torquay. Darwin was diverted by spending hours considering the variety of wild orchids to be found along the shore, continuing an interest in insect pollination dating back to the late 1830s when on the recommendation of Robert Brown he had read Christian Konrad Sprengel on the subject. He wrote a brief paper on the topic. On returning home he looked for these plants near Downe, and found a beautiful spot teeming with orchids which his family named "Orchid Bank". His requests to the wealthy enthusiasts who had taken up growing rare orchids brought large numbers of specimens. These would be a test of his theory: Huxley had once asked "Who has ever dreamed of finding an utilitarian purpose in the forms and colours of flowers?"

He explored the intricacies of how the petals guided specific bees or moths, and found that what had been thought to be three different genera of flowers growing on the same plant (a mysteriously monstrous specimen that puzzled the Linnean Society) were actually the male, female and hermaphrodite forms of the orchid Catasetum. This unusual plant, Darwin discovered, fired arrows with a sticky pollen head as the insects brushed past – to which Hooker responded "Do you really think I can believe all that!" In this, Darwin followed his grandfather Erasmus Darwin in exploring the sex life of plants, he analysed how parts of the plants were "homologous", having evolved from an original structure to meet different functions in different species. He persuaded John Murray that this would be a fashionable book to publish, but his illness returned, causing delay.

Huxley's argument, that natural selection was unproven until evolving varieties could be shown to form species which could not interbreed, turned Darwin's attention to experimenting, pollinating plants and sifting seeds. By collating his results in January 1862 he showed that primroses and cowslips, thought to be varieties, produced sterile hybrids. He convinced Huxley with letters sent to Edinburgh where Huxley was "preaching Darwinism pure & simple as applied to man.... [and] I made 'em listen.. I told them in so many words that I entertained no doubt of the origin of man from the same stock as the apes. Everyone prophesied I should be stoned and cast out of the city gate, but I met with unmitigated applause!"' Darwin was impressed that he had "attacked Bigotry in its strong-hold". Huxley published his lectures as a slim book on Man's Place in Nature.

Darwin persevered with his orchids, and the book, On the various contrivances by which British and foreign orchids are fertilised by insects and the good effects of intercrossing, was published on 15 May 1862, just in time to give Wallace a copy on his return from the far East. While demonstrating that orchids evolve mechanisms that allow for cross-fertilisation, and offering strong evidence for Darwin's larger arguments about variation, the volume also countered natural theology in what Darwin himself admitted was a "flank movement against the enemy." By showing that the "wonderful contrivances" of the orchid have discoverable evolutionary histories, he countered claims by natural theologians that the organisms were examples of the perfect work of the Creator. His interest in orchids continued and he had a hot-house built at Down House, as well as experimenting with other seedlings and "slaving on bones of ducks and pigeon" and variations in other farmyard animals. His illness led to his skin becoming inflamed and shedding, taking "the epidermis a dozen times clean off".

Because of the problems with eczema, Emma told him to grow a beard, and in December his friend Mary Butler commented on the idea of this "long beard".

In January 1863 he got word from Hugh Falconer of a "mis-begotten-bird-creature" fossil, the archaeopteryx, which Owen bought for the British Museum. It fulfilled Darwin's prediction that a proto-bird with unfused wing fingers would be found. Though Owen described it unequivocally as a bird, the subsequent finding that it had teeth left no doubt of its relevance to the Origin of Species. This sudden finding showed just how patchy the known fossil record was.

Huxley continued with his lectures to the working men, and a member of the audience took notes and published six fourpenny pamphlets which were brought together into a book which Darwin thought "capitally written... I may as well shut up shop altogether." On 4 February Lyell published his Geological Evidences of the Antiquity of Man. To Darwin's disappointment Lyell had still not brought himself to clearly endorse Darwin's theory on species or on man, though he had "spoken out... even beyond my state of feeling as to man's unbroken descent from the brutes". Darwin's disappointment brought on ten days of vomiting, faintness and stomach distress. He was much better pleased to then receive Huxley's Man's Place in Nature, printed with a frontispiece showing a line of skeletons, with a gibbon at the end, stooping apes in the middle and upright man at the head, exclaiming "Hurrah, the Monkey Book has come". It included a jibe at Owen's ambiguous "ordained continuous becoming", and though some were horrified at this line of "gibbering, grovelling apes" the 1,000 copies sold quickly, requiring a reprint within weeks.

=== Tendrils and loosestrife ===
The sickness grew worse, and Darwin could only lie on his couch watching the growing tendrils of plants. This interest started with wild cucumber seeds sent by Asa Gray, and he found it "just the sort of niggling work which suits me". After some delays Emma managed to get him to Dr. Gully's spa at Malvern in September 1863, but the prescribed six months rest meant only six months sickness. He was too ill to write, so Emma took dictation.

He began to recover in April 1864, sitting in his greenhouse at home and becoming fascinated by the purple loosestrife he had been breeding for years. This has three kinds of flowers and Darwin explored the eighteen possible sexual combinations, counting the resulting seeds and testing their fertility. Only six "marriages" proved "legitimate", showing that this was another mechanism for cross-pollination. He tabulated the results of his experiments on seeds and wrote them up for the Linnean Society of London. Around this time a Mrs. Becker wrote requesting something edifying for her ladies' literary society, so he sent her On the Sexual Relations of the Three Forms of Lythrum salicaria.

His bedroom, study and greenhouses became filled with climbers, creepers and coiling tendrils, and in May he began a short paper on these plants. He marked their tips to time their movements, and brought Hops indoors, using weights to try to slow their ascent as he sat ill in bed. By 13 September his paper had grown to a 118-page monograph, published by the Linnean Society.

== Changing times ==
Meanwhile, as Darwin worked from his sickbed his friends continued with debates. Asa Gray sent news of the American Civil War, but to Darwin "the destruction of slavery would be well worth a dozen year's war".

Wallace, stirred by the Origin and by Herbert Spencer's Social Statics, had presented his first paper to the racist pro-slavery Anthropological Society of London. He, along with Darwin and the others, supported the abolitionist Ethnological Society of London; Wallace tried to reach a truce by proposing that races had long been separate, but had emerged from a single stock after the ape stage. His view was that competition was between groups, leading "to the inevitable extinction of all those low and mentally undeveloped populations with which the Europeans come into contact", Darwin's experience supported this and he wrote on his copy "natural selection is now acting on the inferior races when put into competition", giving the example of Māoris in New Zealand "dying out like their own native rat".

Where they differed was that Wallace saw mankind evolving mentally but not physically, and this would bring a utopia where everyone would "work out his own happiness" free from policing "since the well balanced moral faculties will never permit any one to transgress on the equal freedom of others... every man will know how to govern himself" and so government would be "replaced by voluntary associations for all beneficial public purposes". Darwin responded that the mental / physical distinction was "grand and most eloquently done" but physical selection continued, through "constant battles" of savages, and unimpeded competition was vital to English society. Wallace replied that wars tended to kill the most fit at the battlefront, and he demurred from "sexual selection". He disputed Darwin's idea that the aristocracy was handsomer than the middle classes by saying that mere manner and refinement were being confused with beauty.

Wallace also thought that the caves of Borneo might reveal "our progenitors" and Lyell tried to organise an expedition hoping to find "extinct ourangs, if not the missing link itself"', but in the absence of funding the consul agreed to have a look.

The scandal of the liberal Anglican theologians' acceptance of evolution and rejection of miracles in Essays and Reviews continued. The two essayists convicted of heresy had the judgement overturned on appeal. Samuel Wilberforce, the High Church and evangelicals organised petitions and a mass backlash against evolution. At the Anglican convocation they tried to make a declaration reaffirming their faith in the harmony of God's word and his works a "Fortieth Article" of the Church of England, and at the British Association moved to overthrow Huxley's "dangerous clique".

=== The X Club ===
Darwin's friends energetically lobbied for his recognition, and after failed attempts in 1862 and 1863 to have him awarded the Royal Society's highest honour, the Copley Medal, their careful preparations and lobbying succeeded in voting their nomination through despite furious politicking in opposition. Darwin was awarded the medal at the Council meeting on the evening of 3 November 1864.

Huxley had made arrangements for a dining club of close friends as select supporters of the evolutionary "new reformation" in naturalism, united by a "devotion to science, pure and free, untrammelled by religious dogmas", and it held its first meeting that same day. Those present were all Fellows of the Royal Society: Huxley, Hooker, John Tyndall, George Busk, Edward Frankland, Herbert Spencer, John Lubbock, and Thomas Archer Hirst. At the December meeting they were joined by William Spottiswoode, and while the club had no agreed name at first, it subsequently became known as the "X Club".

The medal was formally presented at a full meeting on 30 November, which Darwin was unable to attend due to illness. The President, Edward Sabine, used his address to give the Origin faint praise and claim that "Speaking generally and collectively, we have expressly omitted it from the grounds of our award." After the address Huxley called for the Council minutes to prove this false. The minutes made no reference to such an exclusion, or to the Origin, to which Sabine argued that no allusion equalled express exclusion. The row continued afterwards, and the offending passages were altered in the official record of the address. Lyell used his after-dinner speech at the meeting to give guarded support to Darwin's theory in which he gave a "confession of faith as to the Origin", and said that he "had been forced to give up my old faith without thoroughly seeing my way to a new one." Darwin subsequently said that his friend's congratulations "are the real medal to me, and not the round bit of gold".

Early in 1865 Darwin's sickness worsened and he was overcome for almost eight months, lying in bed for weeks at a time, with Emma reading aloud to him. In May he heard of the suicide of Robert FitzRoy, who had been captain of HMS Beagle, and commented that "I never knew in my life so mixed a character. Always much to love & I once loved him sincerely; but so bad a temper & so given to take offence, that I gradually quite lost my love & wished only to keep out of contact with him. Twice he quarrelled bitterly with me, without any just provocation on my part. But certainly there was much noble & exalted in his character."

The Westminster magazine publisher John Chapman was now a qualified specialist in sickness and psychological medicine, and Darwin invited Dr. Chapman to Downe and gave him a long list of the symptoms he had suffered from for 25 years. A spinal freezing treatment seemed to help, and Darwin pressed on with his Variation Under Domestication.

=== Pangenesis ===
He now tackled the chapter of Variation setting out his hypothesis about heredity, that "pangenesis" brought "gemmules" from every cell of the body to the reproductive organs, where they formed the "true ovule or bud" that could pass on traits to the next generation. Huxley was dubious, cautiously writing "Somebody rummaging among your papers half a century hence will find Pangenesis and say, 'See this wonderful anticipation of our modern theories, and that stupid ass Huxley prevented his publishing them."

Times were changing. Lyell became embroiled in a row for having incorporated into Antiquity of Man whole paragraphs of a paper by Lubbock. The "X Club" continued to gain power in the British Association. Huxley's lectures were drawing huge crowds. Darwin had relapsed, but found a new doctor who put him on a crash diet. It seemed to work, but the photographic calling cards popular at the time recorded his deteriorating appearance.

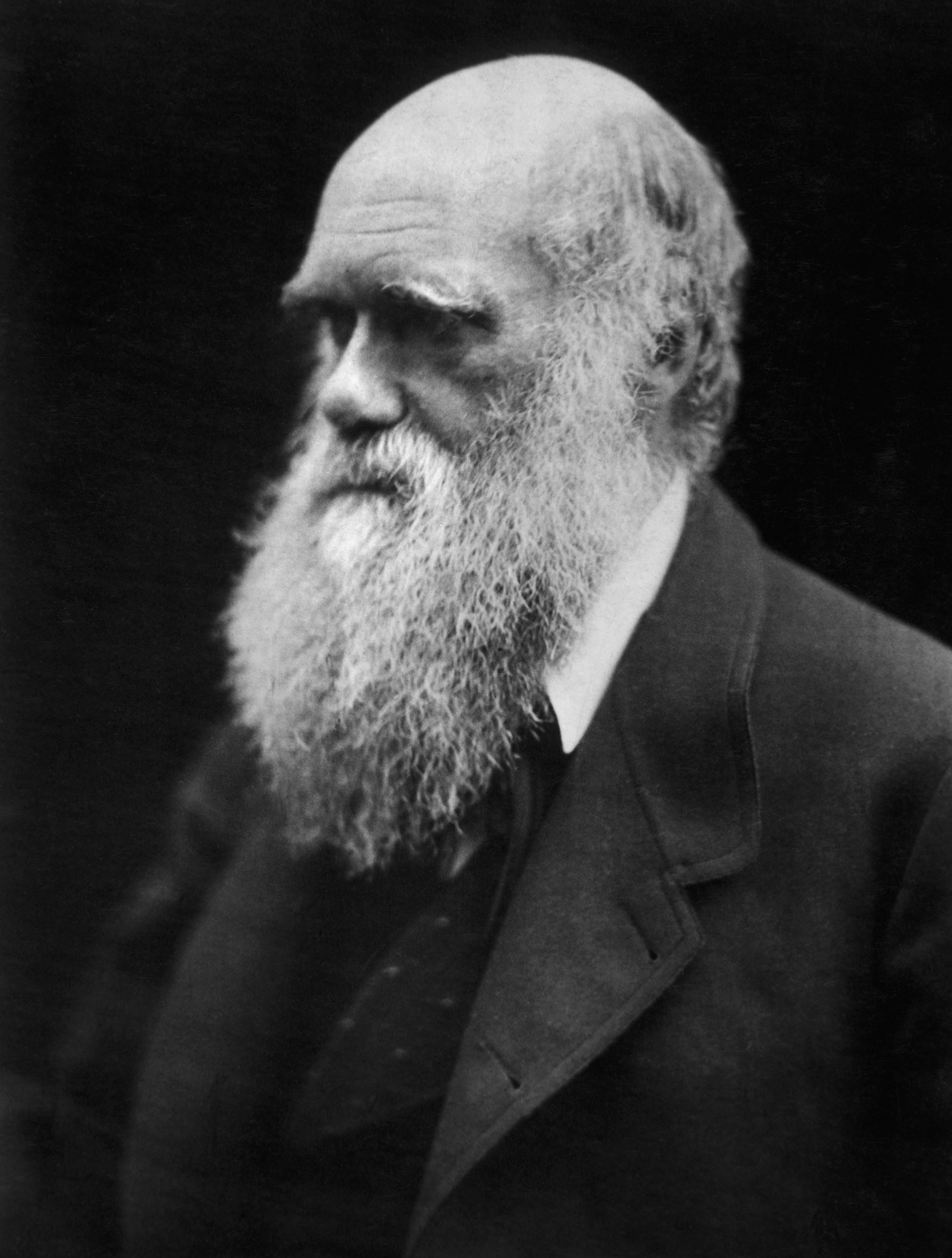
Iconic 1868 portrait by Julia Margaret Cameron showing the bushy beard Darwin had grown by April 1866.

His beard grew bushy and he had to reintroduce himself to friends when he emerged into society at a Royal Society reception on 28 April 1866. Emma recalled that "He was obliged to name himself to almost all of them, as his beard alters him so." This image was made famous by Julia Margaret Cameron's iconic portraits taken during the Darwin family's 1868 holiday in her Isle of Wight cottage. Spencer, in his Principles of Biology, had coined the phrase "survival of the fittest", and though Darwin had struggled with the "detestable style" of the turgid tome, he now agreed with Wallace that it avoided the troublesome anthropomorphism of "selecting", though it "lost the analogy between nature's selection and the fanciers'."

=== British Association ===
In 1866 at the British Association meeting at Nottingham the Guardian reported that Darwin's theory "was everywhere in the ascendant... it was impossible to pass from Section to Section without seeing how deeply these views have leavened the scientific minds of the day."' The association's president, W.R.Grove, said it should be seen "in the history of our own race... the product of slow adaptions, resulting from continuous struggles. Happily in this country, practical experience has taught us to improve rather than remodel; we follow the law of nature and avoid cataclysms." Darwinism was now justifying British society rather than destroying it.

Hooker's speech ended by satirising the opponents of evolution at the 1860 meeting as an uncivilised tribe who saw "every new moon as a new creation of their gods" and ate "the missionaries of the most enlightened nation" for explaining the truth. "The priests first attacked the new doctrine and with fury... the medicine men, however, sided with the missionaries – many from spite to the priests, but a few, i could see, from conviction." Now after six years, the elders were baptised in the new faith and applauded their president for leading them out of the wilderness. Darwin was told of the stunned silence at first, followed by roars of laughter.

The religious press was "surprised and grieved" at this, but now the radical audience splintered into different directions. Following popular interest in Modern Spiritualism, winning over Robert Chambers and Wallace, they printed a pamphlet The Scientific Aspect of the Supernatural.

=== Haeckel ===
Darwin was visited in October 1866 by the zoologist Ernst Haeckel, who over the years had built support for Darwin in Germany, now getting huge classes at Jena for his lectures on Darwinismus. He had gone further, extending selection and struggle to society where it would "drive the peoples onward... to higher cultural stages." He had set out to rearrange all biological knowledge along Darwinian lines in his Generelle Morphologie. He was taken "by storm" when they met and, overawed, began speaking quickly in broken English, then found he could not understand Darwin's reply. They stared at each other for a moment, then burst into laughter and managed to communicate more slowly. When the two volumes of Morphologie arrived later Darwin struggled for weeks with the number of new words like "phylogeny" and "ecology" as well as with the German, before giving up. His only hope was a translation, but the anti-clerical comments would prevent this. He gathered glimpses of Haeckel's ambition to achieve a universal Theory of Development embracing all human knowledge, if not his ideas of German Volk and support for Bismarck's unification of Germany.

Spencer roped Darwin into giving a donation and adding his name, along with Huxley, Wallace and Lyell, to the "Jamaica Committee" seeking to bring to justice Governor Eyre, whose troops had brutally crushed a peasant revolt, with over 400 blacks being executed. Some of his other friends supported the opposing "Eyre Defence and Aid Committee", outraging Darwin's feelings against slavery and oppression. When Darwin's son William, now a banker in Southampton, had his name published "by accident" as having attended a banquet in Eyre's honour, Darwin wrote to the Lord Chancellor to rectify the error. Then the family got together at the house of Erasmus Alvey Darwin, where William made a disparaging remark about the "Jamaica Committee". A furious Charles shouted that if he felt that way, he "had better go back to Southampton". The next morning Charles entered his son's bedroom and told him that he hadn't slept a wink, his anger had been cruel and he was sorry.

== Variation under Domestication ==
Before Christmas 1866 Variation was sent to the printers, save for the last chapter. In this, Darwin wanted to overcome the persistent argument of divinely guided variation. He used the analogy of an architect using rocks which had broken off naturally and fallen to the foot of a cliff, asking "Can it be reasonably maintained that the Creator intentionally ordered... that certain fragments should assume certain shapes so that the builder might erect his edifice?" In the same way, breeders or natural selection picked those that happened to be useful from variations arising by "general laws", to improve plants and animals, "man included". Darwin was now openly including man in his theory, and wanted to add a chapter on this but the book was already too "horridly, disgustingly big" and he shortly decided to write a separate "short essay" on ape ancestry, sexual selection and human expression.

Murray had to make two volumes of it, and being advised that it was hard going planned only 750 copies, though he later doubled that. Translators were eager to get to work: Carus into German, and Vladimir Kovalevsky into Russian – he was sent Murray's proofs, and successfully beat his publication date so that the earliest edition of Variation was in Russian.

During the spring, Darwin tried to find explanations in Sexual Selection for variations in that "eminently domesticated animal", mankind, and for the plumage of birds. As well as drawing on information, he experimented with dyeing pigeons red and trimming the feathers of game-cocks to see if this affected their desirability as a mate. The Duke of Argyll had thrown down a challenge with his book The Reign of Law, which collected criticisms of the Origin and put forward theories of divine design and providential law in a way that struck Darwin as "very well written, very interesting, honest, & clever & very arrogant". It made a particular point of the iridescent colours of hummingbirds, claiming that this was beauty for God's sake without any earthly reason, not explicable by struggle. Wallace gave Reign of Law a withering review, pointing to the existence of stink bugs as well as beauty, and then became entangled in an exchange of detailed arguments with the Duke. To Darwin's despair, Wallace refused to accept a rôle for sexual selection.

Further damage to the Origin came from professor Sir William Thomson (later Lord Kelvin) used calculations of heat loss to estimate a much younger age for the earth than Darwin had been assuming. Thomson's partner in a submarine cable business, the engineer Fleeming Jenkin, then argued convincingly that any single variation would be blended back into the population, so that to form a new species numerous variations would have to be created simultaneously, reintroducing the need for divine intervention.

By June, Lyell was struggling to revise his Principles of Geology, though Darwin still hoped that he would at last "speak out plainly about species". Lyell found Darwin's proofs of Variation "most persuasive", but Darwin was struggling to sort out the changes and corrections he wanted. Encouragement came from the Reverend professor Charles Kingsley, who sent the previously unthinkable news that "the best and strongest men" at the University of Cambridge were "coming over [to] what the world calls Darwinism... The younger M.A.'s are not only willing, but greedy, to hear what you have to say, and... the elder... are facing the whole question in quite a different tone from that they did three years ago... I have been surprised at the change since last winter."

The proofs were finished on 15 November, and The Variation of Animals and Plants Under Domestication went on sale on 30 January 1868, thirteen years after Darwin had begun his experiments on breeding and stewing the bones of pigeons. He was feeling deflated, and concerned about how these large volumes would be received, writing "if I try to read a few pages I feel fairly nauseated... The devil take the whole book". The public were undeterred, and the 1,500 copies went within a week with a second printing at eleven days. The Pall Mall Gazette praised its "noble calmness... undisturbed by the heats of polemical agitation" which made the far from calm Darwin laugh, and left him "cock-a-hoop".

Darwin continued his work with the Descent of Man and Emotions.
