= John Brodie Innes =

English priest

The Reverend John Brodie Innes of Milton Brodie
- Born: John Innes; 26 December 1815
- Died: 19 October 1894 (aged 78)

John Brodie Innes (26 December 1815 – 19 October 1894), John Innes before 1862, was a clergyman who became a close friend of Charles Darwin at Downe in Kent, and remained a friendly correspondent for the rest of Darwin's life.

Born John Innes, he inherited the family estate near Forres in Scotland, and moved there in 1862, becoming John Brodie Innes of Milton Brodie.

== Early life ==
John Innes was born in 1815, the son of Colonel John Innes of Ipstone (or Ibstone) House and Mary Leslie of Burdsbank. Ipstone House is located in the parish of Ipstone (Ibstone), which lies mostly in the county of Oxfordshire but also partly in the county of Buckinghamshire, England. The boundary line of these two counties passes straight through the parlour of Ipstone House. John Brodie-Innes married Eliza Mary Laidlaw in 1847.

== Church career in Kent ==
John Innes became Curate of Farnborough in Kent in 1842, and made the acquaintance of Darwin who moved to Down House in the nearby village of Downe in that year. Innes became perpetual curate of Downe in 1846, and hence vicar in 1868–1869. Darwin became involved with local charitable organisations including the Coal and Clothing Fund, a savings club to which he made honorary contributions and which he later ran from 1848 to 1869, taking over from Innes.

Darwin also co-founded a Friendly Club with Innes, to which local people subscribed for assurance of assistance in times of financial need, and served as its treasurer for over 30 years, even hosting the Friendly Club's annual meeting on the lawn of Down House, the Darwin family's home.

== Milton Brodie, Forres ==
Brodie Innes continued to correspond with Darwin after 1862 when Innes moved to take up an inherited estate at Milton Brodie, Forres in Scotland, and as required by the entail on the estate, changed his name to reflect his position as chief of the Brodies of the Milton branch of Clan Brodie.

In a letter written to Darwin in December 1878, Brodie Innes explains how he described Darwin to bishops at a Church Congress in Dundee:

"I have the pleasure of the intimate friendship of one of the very first Naturalists in Europe. He is a most accurate observer, and never states anything as a fact which he has not most thoroughly investigated. He is a man of the most perfect moral character, and his scrupulous regard for the strictest truth is above that of almost all men I know. I am quite persuaded that if on any morning he met with a fact which would clearly contradict one of his cherished theories he would not let the sun set before he made it known. I never saw a word in his writings which was an attack on Religion. He follows his own course as a Naturalist and leaves Moses to take care of himself."

The last letter between the two listed by the Darwin Correspondence Project is dated 1881.

Brodie Innes was the Chaplain to the Bishop of Moray from 1861 to 1880 and again from 1886 to 1894.

His son was the barrister and novelist John William Brodie-Innes.

== Portrayal in film ==
In the 2009 film Creation the Reverend John Innes was played by actor Jeremy Northam.
