= The Variation of Animals and Plants Under Domestication =

1868 book by Charles Darwin

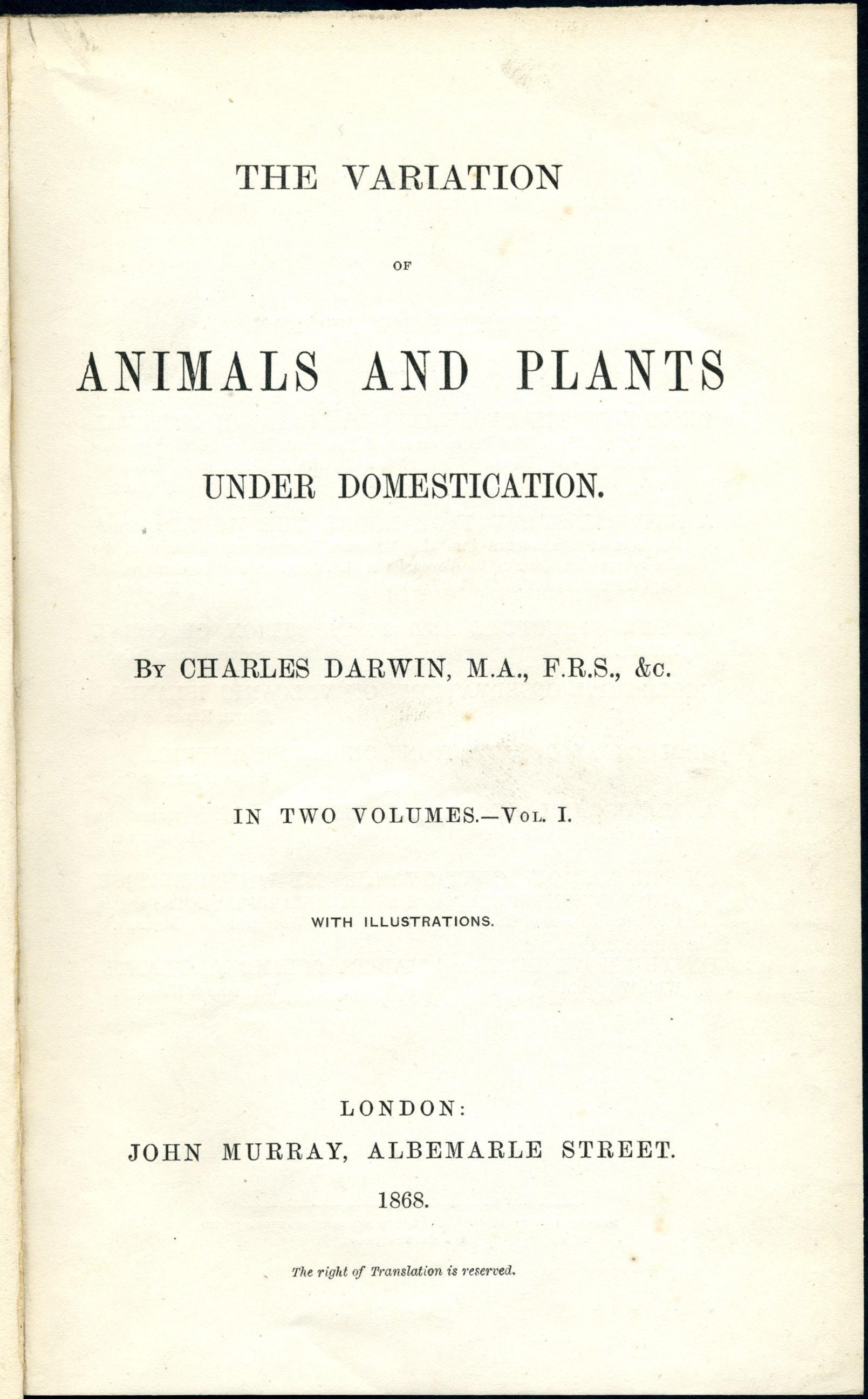
- Title page of the first edition of The Variation of Animals and Plants Under Domestication
- Author: Charles Darwin
- Language: English
- Subject: Artificial selection
- Publisher: John Murray
- Publication date: 30 January 1868
- Publication place: United Kingdom
- Media type: Print (hardback)
- Pages: Vol 1: viii,411 +43 figs Vol 2: viii,486.
- OCLC: 960106244

The Variation of Animals and Plants Under Domestication is a book by Charles Darwin that was first published in January 1868. A large proportion of the book contains detailed information on the domestication of animals and plants, but it also contains in Chapter XXVII a description of Darwin's theory of heredity which he called pangenesis.

The Variation of Animals and Plants Under Domestication went on sale on 30 January 1868, thirteen years after Darwin had begun his experiments on breeding and stewing the bones of pigeons. He was feeling deflated, and concerned about how these large volumes would be received, writing "if I try to read a few pages I feel fairly nauseated ... The devil take the whole book". In his autobiography, Darwin estimated that he had spent 4-year 2 months "hard labour" on the book.

== Background ==
Darwin had been working for two years writing his "big book", provisionally titled Natural Selection, when on 18 June 1858 he received a parcel from Alfred Wallace, who was then living in Borneo. It enclosed a twenty pages manuscript describing an evolutionary mechanism that was similar to Darwin's own theory. Under pressure to publish his ideas, Darwin started work on an "abstract" summary, which was published in November 1859 as On the Origin of Species. In the introduction he announced that in a future publication he hoped to give "in detail all the facts, with references, on which my conclusions have been grounded".

On 9 January 1860, two days after the publication of the second edition of Origin, Darwin returned to his original Natural Selection manuscript and began expanding the first two chapters on "Variation under Domestication". He had a large collection of additional notes and by the middle of June had written drafts of an introduction and two chapters on the domestication of pigeons that would eventually form part of The Variation of Animals and Plants Under Domestication. Darwin apparently found writing the book tiresome and writes in his autobiography that he had been "tempted to publish on other subjects which at the time interested me more." In the following July (1861) he began work on different book, the Fertilisation of Orchids which was published in May 1862.

Darwin continued to gather data. His own practical experiments were confined to plants but he was able to gather information from others by correspondence and even to arrange for some of his correspondents to conduct experiments on his behalf. In spite of protracted periods of illness, he made progress and in March 1865 wrote to his publisher, John Murray, saying that "Of present book I have 7 chapters ready for press & all others very forward, except the last & concluding one" (the book as finally published consisted of 28 chapters). In the same letter he discussed illustrations for the book.

Darwin had been mulling for many years on a theory of heredity. In May 1865 he sent a manuscript to his friend Thomas Huxley outlining his theory which he called pangenesis and asking whether he should publish it. In his accompanying letter Darwin wrote "It is a very rash & crude hypothesis yet it has been a considerable relief to my mind, & I can hang on it a good many groups of facts." Huxley pointed out the similarities of pangenesis to the theories of Georges Louis Leclerc, Comte de Buffon, and the Swiss naturalist Charles Bonnet but eventually wrote encouraging Darwin to publish: "Somebody rummaging among your papers half a century hence will find Pangenesis & say 'See this wonderful anticipation of our modern Theories—and that stupid ass, Huxley, prevented his publishing them'".

== Publication ==
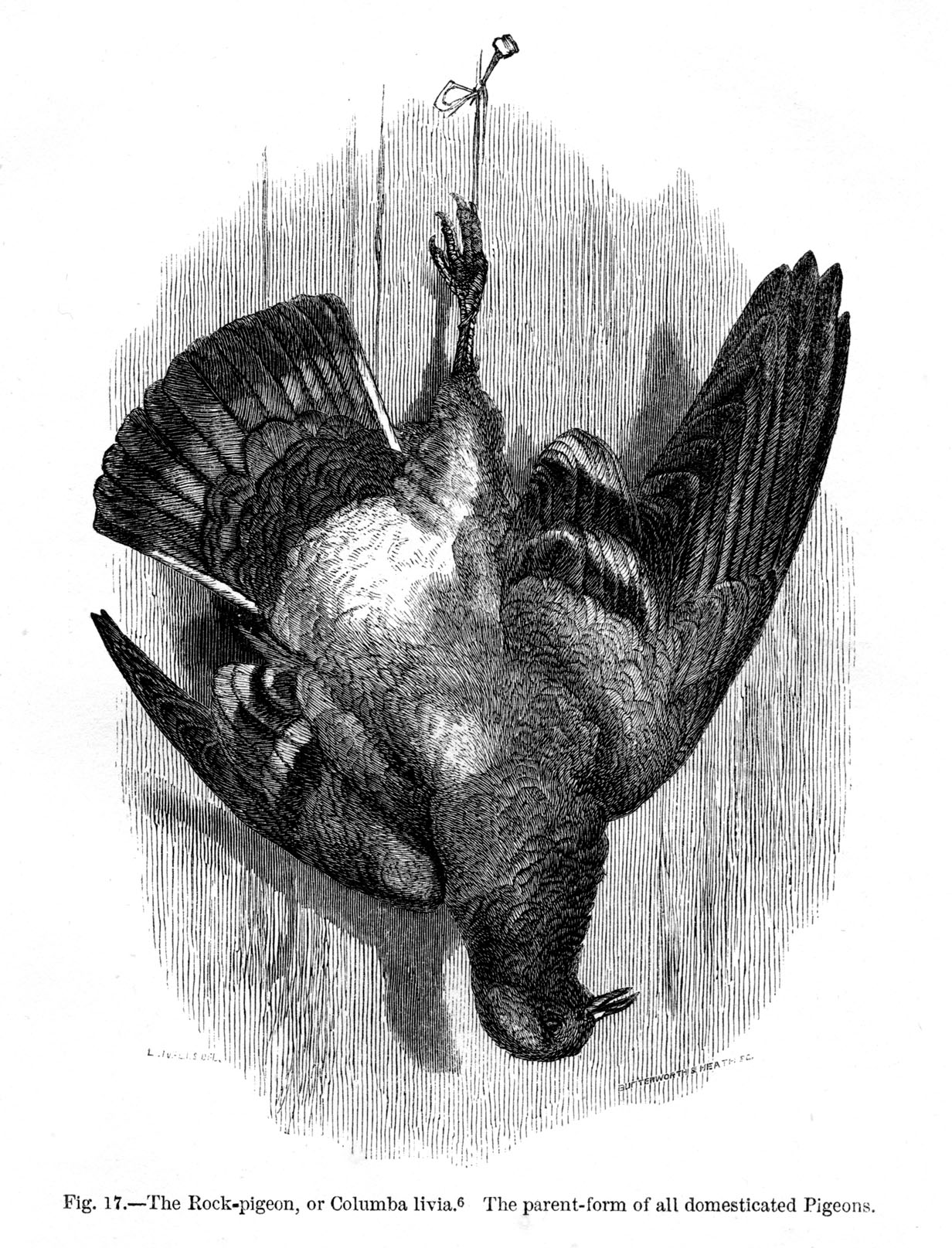
Rock dove or Columba livia, the parent form of all domesticated pigeons

Just before Christmas 1866 all of the manuscript except for the final chapter was sent to the publisher. At the beginning January on receiving an estimate of the size of the two volume book from the printers he wrote to his publisher: "I cannot tell you how sorry I am to hear of the enormous size of my Book." He subsequently arranged for some of the more technical sections to be set in smaller type.

Even at this late stage Darwin was uncertain as to whether to include a chapter on mankind. At the end of January he wrote to Murray: "I feel a full conviction that my Chapter on man will excite attention & plenty of abuse & I suppose abuse is as good as praise for selling a Book" but he then apparently decided against the idea for a week later in a letter to his close friend Joseph Hooker he explained "I began a chapter on Man, for which I have long collected materials, but it has grown too long, & I think I shall publish separately a very small volume, 'an essay on the origin of mankind'". This "essay" would become two books: The Descent of Man, and Selection in Relation to Sex (1871) and The Expression of Emotions in Man and Animals (1872).

The book had been advertised as early as 1865 with the unwieldy title Domesticated Animals and Cultivated Plants, or the Principles of Variation, Inheritance, Reversion, Crossing, Interbreeding, and Selection under Domestication but Darwin agreed to the shorter The Variation of Animals and Plants Under Domestication suggested by the compositors. By May he had arranged for the book to be translated into French, Russian and German. The French edition would be translated by Jean Jacques Moulinié, the German by Julius Victor Carus who had produced the revised version of Origin in 1866 and the Russian edition by Vladimir Onufrievich Kovalevsky, the brother of the embryologist Alexander Kovalevsky.

Darwin received the first proofs on 1 March 1867. In the tedious task of making correction he was helped by his 23-year-old daughter Henrietta Emma Darwin. In the summer while she was away in Cornwall he wrote to commend her work, "All your remarks, criticisms doubts & corrections are excellent, excellent, excellent". While making corrections Darwin also added new material. The proofs were finished on 15 November, but there was a further delay while William Dallas prepared an index.

The Variation of Animals and Plants Under Domestication went on sale on 30 January 1868, thirteen years after Darwin had begun his experiments on breeding and stewing the bones of pigeons. He was feeling deflated, and concerned about how these large volumes would be received, writing "if I try to read a few pages I feel fairly nauseated ... The devil take the whole book". In his autobiography he estimated that he had spent 4-year 2 months "hard labour" on the book.

== Contents ==
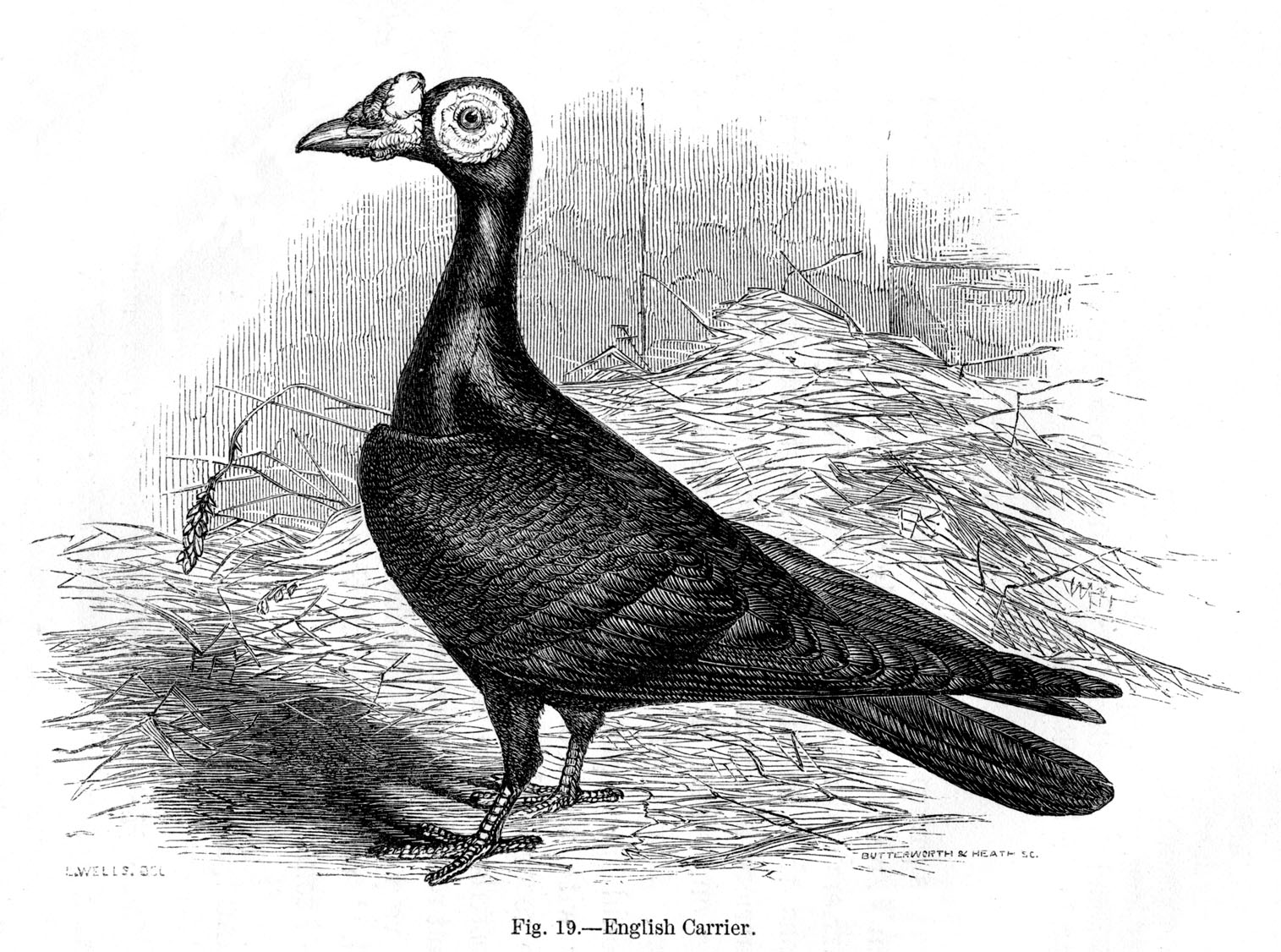
English carrier pigeon – one of many domesticated varieties deriving from the wild Columba livia or rock dove

The first volume of The Variation of Animals and Plants Under Domestication consists in a lengthy and highly detailed exploration of the mechanisms of variation, including the principle of use and disuse, the principle of the correlation of parts, and the role of the environment in causing variation, at work in a number of domestic species. Darwin starts with dogs and cats, discussing the similarities between wild and domesticated dogs, and musing on how the species changed to accommodate man's wishes. He attempts to trace a genealogy of contemporary varieties (or "races") back to a few early progenitors. These arguments, as well as many others, use the vast amount of data Darwin gathered about dogs and cats to support his overarching thesis of evolution through natural selection. He then goes on to make similar points regarding horses and donkeys, sheep, goats, pigs, cattle, various types of domesticated fowl, a large number of different cultivated plants, and, most thoroughly, pigeons.

Notably, in Chapter XXVII Darwin introduced his "provisional hypothesis" of pangenesis that he had first outlined to Huxley in 1865. He proposed that each part of an organism contains minute invisible particles which he called gemmules. These were capable of regenerating the organism so that the leaf of a begonia or a worm chopped into pieces could generate the complete organism and a salamander or crab that lost a limb could regenerate the limb. The gemmules were dispersed around the organism and could multiply by division. In sexual reproduction they were transmitted from parents to their offspring with the mixing of the gemmules producing offspring with 'blended' characteristics of the parents. Gemmules could also remain dormant for several generations before becoming active. He also suggested that the environment might affect the gemmules in an organism and thus allowed for the possibility of the Lamarckian inheritance of acquired characteristics. Darwin believed that his theory could explain a wide range of phenomena:

All the forms of reproduction graduate into each other and agree in their product; for it is impossible to distinguish between organisms produced from buds, from self-division, or from fertilised germs ... and as we now see that all the forms of reproduction depend on the aggregation of gemmules derived from the whole body, we can understand this general agreement. It is satisfactory to find that sexual and asexual generation ... are fundamentally the same. Parthenogenesis is no longer wonderful; in fact, the wonder is that it should not oftener occur.

In the final pages of the book Darwin directly challenged the argument of divinely guided variation advocated by his friend and supporter the American botanist Asa Gray. He used the analogy of an architect using rocks which had broken off naturally and fallen to the foot of a cliff, asking "Can it be reasonably maintained that the Creator intentionally ordered ... that certain fragments should assume certain shapes so that the builder might erect his edifice?" In the same way, breeders or natural selection picked those that happened to be useful from variations arising by "general laws", to improve plants and animals, "man included". Darwin concluded with: "However much we may wish it, we can hardly follow Professor Asa Gray in his belief that 'variation has been along certain beneficial lines,' like a 'stream along definite and useful lines of irrigation'". Darwin confided to Hooker "It is foolish to touch such subjects, but there have been so many allusions to what I think about the part which God has played in the formation of organic beings, that I thought it shabby to evade the question."

== Reception ==
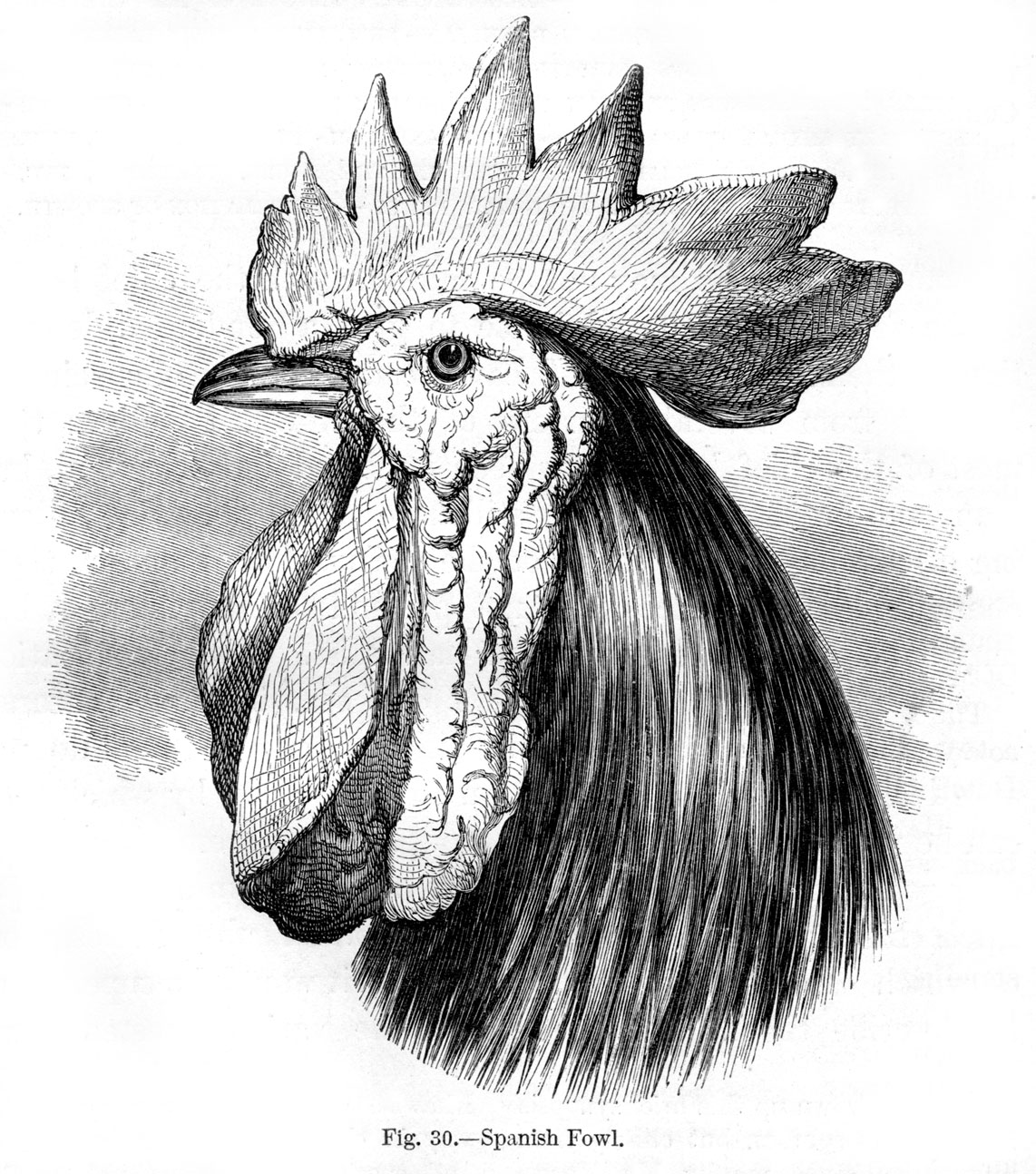
Spanish fowl

Darwin was concerned whether anyone would read the massive volumes and was also anxious to receive feedback from his friends on their views on pangenesis. In October 1867 before the book was published he sent copies of the corrected proofs to Asa Gray with the comment: "The chapter on what I call Pangenesis will be called a mad dream, and I shall be pretty well satisfied if you think it a dream worth publishing; but at the bottom of my own mind I think it contains a great truth." He wrote to Hooker: "I shall be intensely anxious to hear what you think about Pangenesis" and to the German naturalist Fritz Müller: "The greater part, as you will see, is not meant to be read; but I should very much like to hear what you think of 'Pangenesis'." Few of Darwin's colleagues shared his enthusiasm for pangenesis. Wallace was initially supportive and Darwin confided to him: "None of my friends will speak out, except to a certain extent Sir H. Holland, who found it very tough reading, but admits that some view 'closely akin to it' will have to be admitted."

By the end of April Variation had received more than 20 reviews. An anonymous review by George Henry Lewes in the Pall Mall Gazette praised its "noble calmness ... undisturbed by the heats of polemical agitation" which made the far from calm Darwin laugh, and left him "cock-a-hoop".

In 1875 a second edition was published in which Darwin made a number of corrections and also reworked Chapter XI on Bud-variation and Chapter XXVII on Pangenesis. The book never became popular and sold only 5000 copies in Darwin's lifetime.

De Vries in 1889 praised the "masterly survey of the phenomena to be explained" and accepted the idea that "the individual hereditary qualities of the whole organism are represented by definite material particles". He introduced the notion of intracellula pangenesis which, following August Weismann, rejected the idea that these particles were thrown off from all the cells of the body. He called the particles "pangens", later abbreviated to "gene".

In a similar vein, Weismann in his 1893 work Germ-Plasm said "although Darwin modestly described his theory as a provisional hypothesis, his was, nevertheless, the first comprehensive attempt to explain all the known phenomena of heredity by a common principle ... [I]n spite of the fact that a considerable number of these assumptions are untenable, a part of the theory still remains which must be accepted as fundamental and correct,--in principle at any rate,--not only now but for all time to come. ... presupposing the existence of material particles in the germ which possess the properties of the living being ... I must honestly confess to having mentally resisted this fundamental point of the Darwinian doctrine for a long time."

== See also ==
- Inception of Darwin's theory
- Publication of Darwin's theory
- Darwin from Orchids to Variation
- List of works by Charles Darwin
- Domestication syndrome
