= Period Piece (book) =

1952 autobiographical memoir by Gwen Raverat

- First UK edition
- Author: Gwen Raverat
- Illustrator: Gwen Raverat
- Language: English
- Genre: Memoir
- Published: 1952 (UK: Faber & Faber); 1952 (US: W. W. Norton)
- Publication place: United Kingdom
- OCLC: 475803

Period Piece: A Cambridge Childhood is a 1952 autobiographical memoir by the English wood engraver Gwen Raverat covering her childhood in late 19th-century Cambridge society. The book includes anecdotes about and illustrations of many of her extended family (see Darwin–Wedgwood family).

As the author explains in the preface it is "a circular book" and although it begins with the meeting of her parents (Sir George Darwin and Maud du Puy) and ends with Gwen as a student at The Slade, it is not written chronologically, but rather arranged in a series of fifteen themed chapters, each dealing with a particular aspects of life. The book is illustrated with numerous pen and ink drawings by the author.

The book is dedicated to her cousin Frances Cornford.

It was originally published by Faber & Faber in 1952 in hardback and as a paperback in 1960. It was reviewed in The Times and by David Daiches in The Manchester Guardian

Period Piece has been translated into Danish (Min forunderlige barndom, 1980), Swedish (Så var det då : min barndom i Cambridge, 1985) and German (Eine Kindheit in Cambridge, 1991).

== Family trees ==
The author's immediate family consisted of her father, Sir George Darwin, her mother, Lady Maud Darwin, and their four children; Gwen and her younger siblings Charles Galton Darwin, Margaret, and William "Billy". At the very beginning of the book, two family trees are given, one for the author's mother and one for her father. The family trees are reproduced here with minor modification:

=== Mother's family tree ===
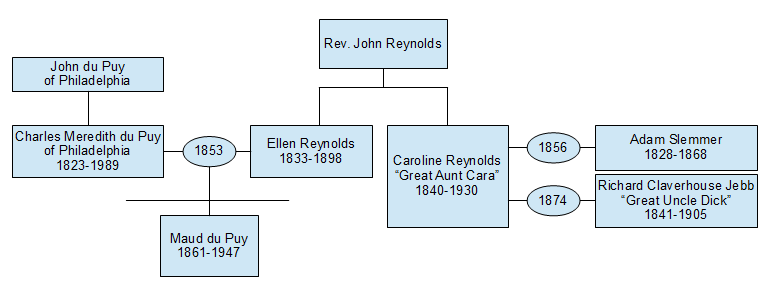
The author's mother's (Maud du Puy's) family tree, adapted from the tree in the book. NB: Maud's siblings are missing.

=== Father's family tree ===
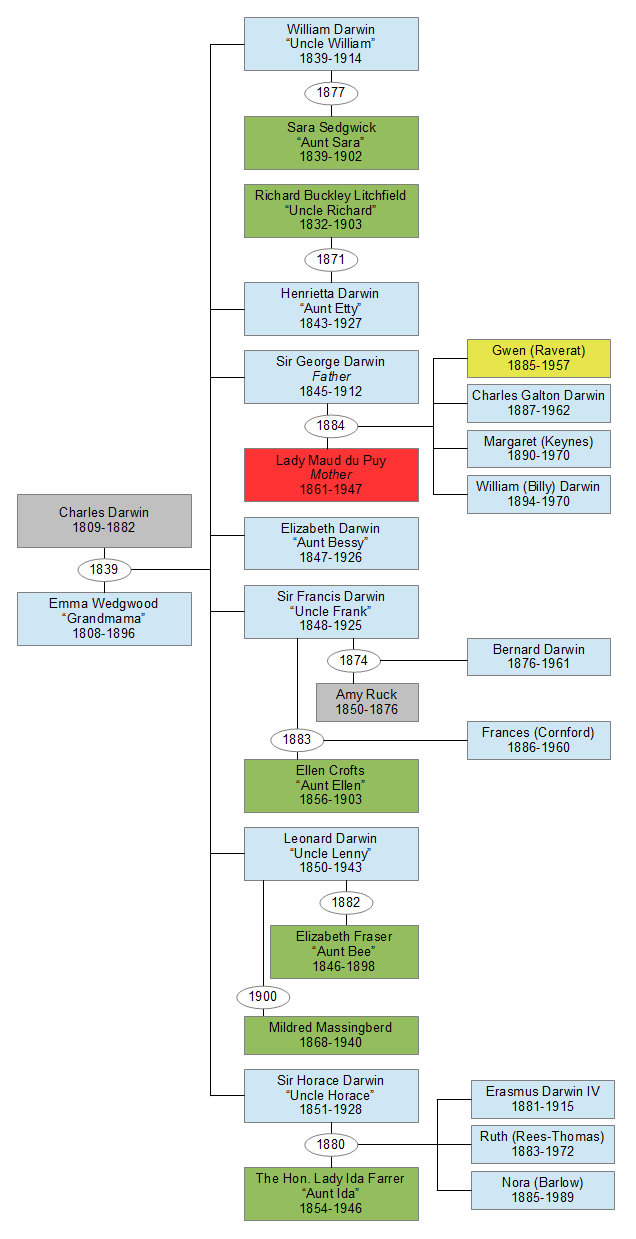
The author's quite extensive family tree. The author is in yellow.

The author's father was Sir George Darwin. Her father had a large extended family. Gwen's grandfather, Charles Darwin died before Gwen's birth, but his wife Emma Darwin ("Grandmama") lived until 1896. Charles and Emma had seven children who survived to adulthood - four uncles and two aunts to Gwen. All bar one of the uncles and aunts were married, and two uncles had children, resulting in five cousins:

Uncles

- William Erasmus Darwin ("Uncle William")
- Sir Francis Darwin ("Uncle Frank")
- Leonard Darwin ("Uncle Lenny")
- Sir Horace Darwin ("Uncle Horace").

Aunts

- Henrietta Litchfield ("Aunt Etty")
- Elizabeth ("Aunt Bessy").

Uncle's and aunt's spouses

- Sara (née Sedgwick - "Aunt Sara") - William's wife
- Richard Buckley Litchfield ("Uncle Richard") - Aunt Etty's husband
- Ellen (née Crofts, "Aunt Ellen") - Frank's second wife
- Elizabeth (née Fraser, "Aunt Bee") - Leonard first wife
- Mildred Massingberd - Leonard's second wife
- The Hon. Ida née Farrer ("Aunt Ida") - Horace's wife.

(Note: Florence Henrietta Darwin, Frank's third wife is briefly mentioned but the marriage was after the time period in the book).

Cousins

- Bernard Darwin (son of Frank by his first wife Amy Ruck)
- Frances (daughter of Frank and Aunt Ellen)
- Erasmus Darwin IV (son and eldest child of Horace and Ida)
- Ruth (elder daughter of Horace and Ida)
- Nora (younger daughter of Horace and Ida)

Second cousins

Although not in the trees drawn in the book, the following second cousins are also mentioned:

- Ralph Wedgwood
- Felix Wedgwood (brother of Ralph)
- Ralph Vaughan Williams

== Chapter synopses ==
Chapter	Name	Synopsis
I	Prelude	Gwen's family background; how her parents met, "Great Aunt Cara" (Caroline Lane Reynolds Slemmer Jebb) and "Great Uncle Dick" (Richard Claverhouse Jebb). The reference to Maud's suitor "Mr T" is Henry Martyn Taylor.
II	Newnham Grange	Newnham Grange is the family home in Cambridge, where Gwen grows up with her younger siblings Margaret, Charles (Charles Galton Darwin) and "Billy" (William). It regularly subject to flooding.
III	Theories	
IV	Education	Being educated privately.
V	Ladies	Aunt Cara's earlier life.
VI	Propriety	Acting as a "chaperon", the courting process as viewed by a child, and the need to keep up appearances to avoid scandal.
VII	Aunt Etty	"Aunt Etty" (Henrietta Litchfield) and her husband "Uncle Richard" (Richard Buckley Litchfield) are described. Ill health as a Darwin characteristic.
VIII	Down	Description of Down House, in Downe, Kent the former family home of the author's grandfather Charles Darwin, who had died before her birth, and where his widow "Grandmama" (Emma Darwin) resides with unmarried "Aunt Bessy" (Elizabeth Darwin) during the summers (spending winters in Cambridge) until the former's death.
IX	Ghosts and Horrors	Childhood fears.
X	The Five Uncles	Descriptions of the "five uncles", the Darwin brothers, sons of Charles and Emma Darwin, split into subchapters: "Uncle William" (William Erasmus Darwin) and his wife "Aunt Sara".; "Uncle George" (Sir George Darwin) - Gwen's father but described as an uncle because "among uncles I include my father. A father is only a specialized kind of uncle anyhow"; "Uncle Frank" (Sir Francis Darwin), his son Bernard; his second wife "Aunt Ellen" and their daughter Frances, and third wife Lady Florence Henrietta Darwin, "Uncle Lenny" (Leonard Darwin) and his first wife "Aunt Bee", and his second wife Charlotte Mildred Massingberd; "Uncle Horace" (Sir Horace Darwin), his wife "Aunt Ida" (Ida Darwin) and their children Nora, Erasmus and Ruth.
XI	Religion	The author's childhood understanding of God, and morality. Going to a boarding school as a non-conformist.
XII	Sport	Childhood games; cycling; card games, "Being Kind to Poor Pamela"
XIII	Clothes	Clothes, makeup and their difficulties.
XIV	Society	Disliking dance class; tea at Trinity, seeing "Great Men" (Lord Kelvin, Ralph Vaughan Williams, Sir Francis Galton and Paul Cambon); a family picnic; the end of childhood with Frances's wedding.
