= Health of Charles Darwin =

Discussion of Darwin's long-term debilitating conditions

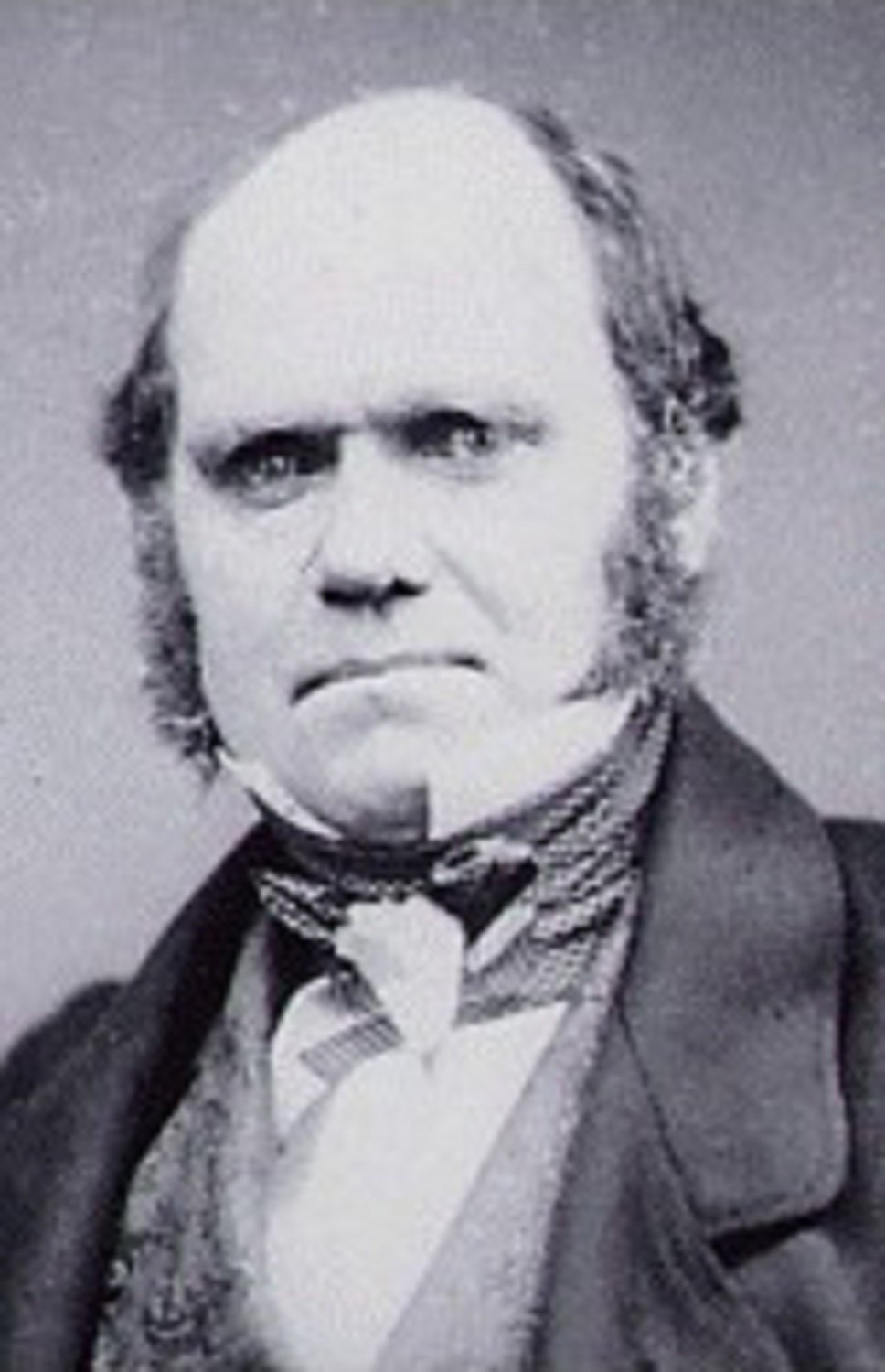
Charles Darwin (1809–1882)

For much of his adult life, Charles Darwin's health was repeatedly compromised by an uncommon combination of symptoms, leaving him severely debilitated for long periods of time. However, Darwin himself suggested that, in some ways, this may have helped his work: "Even ill-health, though it has annihilated several years of my life, has saved me from the distractions of society and amusement."

Darwin consulted numerous doctors, but, with the medical science of the time, the cause remained undiagnosed. He tried all available treatments, but these had at best only temporary success. More recently, there has been much speculation as to the nature of his illness.

It has been suggested that exhuming Darwin's remains could clarify the nature of his health issues.

== Development of illness and symptoms ==
As a medical student at the University of Edinburgh, Darwin found that he was too sensitive to the sight of blood and the brutality of surgery at the time, so he turned his attention to natural history, an extramural interest he developed when studying at the University of Cambridge to qualify as a clergyman.

On 10 December 1831, as he waited in Plymouth for the voyage on HMS Beagle to begin, he suffered from chest pain and heart palpitations, but told no one at the time in case it stopped him from going on the survey expedition. During the voyage, he suffered badly from sea-sickness during the eighteen months he was at sea, but he spent much of the three years and three months he was on land in strenuous exploration. In Argentina at the start of October 1833, he collapsed with a fever. He spent two days in bed, and then memories of a young shipmate who had died of the fever persuaded him to take a boat down river to Buenos Aires, lying ill in his cabin until the fever passed.

On 20 September 1834, while returning from a horseback expedition in the Andes mountains, he fell ill and spent the month of October in bed in Valparaíso. This would be consistent with infection with Trypanosoma cruzi, which causes Chagas disease. In his diary for 25 March 1835, while to the east of the Andes near Mendoza, he noted "an attack (for it deserves no less a name) of the Benchuca, a species of Reduvius, the great black bug of the Pampas". These are associated with transmittal of Trypanosoma cruzi causing Chagas' disease, but in subsequent days he does not mention the fever characteristic of first infection, which may have occurred in September 1834.

After the voyage ended on 2 October 1836, he quickly established himself as an eminent geologist, at the same time secretly beginning speculations on transmutation as he conceived of his theory. On 20 September 1837, he suffered "an uncomfortable palpitation of the heart" and as "strongly" advised by his doctors, left for a month of recuperation in the countryside. That October he wrote, "Of late anything which flurries me completely knocks me up afterwards, and brings on a violent palpitation of the heart." In the spring of 1838 he was overworked, worried and suffering stomach upsets and headaches which caused him to be unable to work for days on end. These intensified and heart troubles returned, so in June he went "geologising" in Scotland and felt fully recuperated. Later that year however, bouts of illness returned—a pattern which would continue. He married Emma Wedgwood on 29 January 1839, and in December of that year as Emma's first pregnancy progressed, he fell ill and accomplished little during the following year.

For over forty years Darwin suffered intermittently from various combinations of symptoms such as: malaise, vertigo, dizziness, muscle spasms and tremors, vomiting, cramps and colics, bloating and nocturnal intestinal gas, headaches, alterations of vision, severe tiredness, nervous exhaustion, dyspnea, skin problems such as blisters all over the scalp and eczema, crying, anxiety, sensation of impending death and loss of consciousness, fainting, tachycardia, insomnia, tinnitus, and depression.

=== Water treatment ===
Darwin had no success with conventional treatments. In 1849, after about four months of incessant vomiting he took up the recommendation of his friend Captain Sulivan and cousin Fox to try the water therapy regimen at Dr James Gully's Water Cure Establishment at Malvern. He read Gully's book, which provided case histories and had a price list at the back. Darwin rented a villa at Malvern for his family and started a two-month trial of the treatment on 10 March. Gully agreed with Darwin's self-diagnosis of nervous dyspepsia and set him a routine including being heated by a spirit lamp until dripping with perspiration, then vigorous rubbing with cold wet towels and cold foot baths, a strict diet, and walks. Darwin enjoyed the attention and the demanding regime which left him no time to feel guilty about not working. His health improved rapidly, and he felt that the water cure was "no quackery". He had no faith in the homeopathic medicines Gully gave him three times a day but took them obediently. They stayed on until 30 June, and back home at Down House, he continued with the diet and with the water treatment aided by his butler. He followed the rules about rising early and rationing his working time and had the Sandwalk constructed in the grounds for his walking exercise, setting a routine which he continued.

In September, his sickness returned during the excitement of a British Association for the Advancement of Science meeting, and Darwin made a day visit to Malvern, then recuperated at home. In June 1850, after losing time to illness (without vomiting), he spent a week at Malvern. Later that year he wrote to Fox about the credulity of his "beloved Dr Gully" who when his daughter was ill, treated her with a clairvoyant girl to report on internal changes, a mesmerist to put her to sleep, John Chapman as homeopathist and himself as hydropathist, after which Gully's daughter recovered. Darwin explained to Fox his wrathful scepticism about clairvoyance and worse, homeopathy, thinking the infinitesimal doses were against all common sense and should be compared against the effects of no treatment at all. Gully had pestered Darwin to subject himself to clairvoyance, and when he saw the clairvoyant, he tried to test her by asking her to read the number on a banknote he had in an envelope, but she scornfully said this was something her maidservant did and proceeded to diagnose horrors in Darwin's insides, a tale he recounted for years afterwards. When Darwin's own young daughter Annie had persistent indigestion, he confidently took her to Gully on 24 March 1851 and after a week, left her there to take the cure but a fortnight later was recalled by Dr. Gully as Annie had bilious fever. Dr. Gully was attentive and repeatedly reassured them that she was recovering, but after a series of crises, Annie died on 23 April. Darwin was heartbroken at this tragic loss, but surprisingly stayed well in the aftermath, busy with organising the funeral arrangements.

Darwin kept records of the effects of the continuing water treatment at home and in 1852 stopped the regime, having found that it was of some help with relaxation but overall had no significant effect, indicating that it served only to decrease his psychosomatic symptomatology.

With the memories of Annie's death, Darwin did not want to return to Malvern. In 1856, he began writing for publication of his theory, and he pressed on, overworking, until by March 1857 illness was cutting his working day "ridiculously short". He found a new hydrotherapist, Dr. Edward Wickstead Lane, whose Moor Park hydropathic establishment near Farnham in Surrey was only 40 miles from Darwin's home. His condition was much as when Darwin had first seen Gully, and Dr. Lane later wrote, "I cannot recall any [case] where the pain was as poignant as his. When the worst attacks were on, he seemed crushed with agony." Darwin arrived on 22 April and wrote to Fox that "it is really quite astonishing & utterly unaccountable the good this one week has done me", deciding to stay on to 5 May. He enjoyed the more relaxed regime, which did not include clairvoyance, mesmerism or homeopathy, as Lane did "not believe in all the rubbish which Dr G. does." Darwin became a complete convert, "well convinced that the only thing for Chronic cases is the water-cure", and wrote, "I really think I shall make a point of coming here for a fortnight occasionally, as the country is very pleasant for walking." He told Hooker he had "already received an amount of good, which is quite incredible to myself & quite unaccountable.—I can walk & eat like a hearty Christian; & even my nights are good.—I cannot in the least understand how hydropathy can act as it certainly does on me. It dulls one's brain splendidly, I have not thought about a single species of any kind, since leaving home." He then contradicted himself by asking about alpine species.

He returned to Moor Park from 16 to 29 June and 5–12 November 1857 and from 20 April to 3 May 1858, but this retreat was unavailable when he was shocked by receipt of Wallace's paper on 18 June, as Dr. Lane was put on trial accused of adultery with a lady patient. Darwin was able to resume treatment at Moor Park from 25 to 31 October 1858, as he struggled on to write On the Origin of Species despite repeated health problems. He was able to keep writing thanks to visits to the spa on 5–18 February, 21–28 May and 19–26 July 1859.

With the proofs of the book returned to the printers, he was worn out. On 2 October, he left for Ilkley and had treatment at Wells House hydropathic establishment operated by Dr. Edmund Smith, a surgeon and hydropathic doctor. Emma brought their children on 17 October, and the family including Darwin stayed in North House, Wells Terrace, which he rented. Reading the first adverse reviews there, his health worsened with a sprained ankle followed by a swollen leg and face, boils and a rash. He had an "odious time", and wrote of Smith that "he constantly gives me impression, as if he cared very much for the Fee & very little for the patient". By 6 November, he felt worse than when he came. Emma and the children went home on 24 November. Darwin stayed on in the establishment, and for the last ten days of the stay, he felt much better. He returned home on 7 December, and under pressure of work, his health slipped back a bit.

As arguments continued, Darwin had more stomach upsets, and on 28 June 1860, two days before the famous 1860 Oxford evolution debate, he fled to Lane's new hydropathic establishment at Sudbrooke Park, Petersham, near Richmond in Surrey and recuperated as well as reading reports of the debate.

Darwin avoided further hydropathy, perhaps recalling his time at Ilkley, and Lane left the business for a while after selling Sudbrooke Park. In 1863, Darwin's illness worsened seriously, and Emma Darwin persuaded her husband to return to Malvern. His cousin Fox had earlier told him that Gully had suffered a mental breakdown and was unavailable. They arrived on 2 September, but Darwin felt that he was being fobbed off with the supervising physician, Dr. Ayerst. Emma arranged for Dr. Gully to attend and endorse Ayerst's treatment, but by then Darwin's eczema was too raw to bear any water. Darwin had a complete breakdown and on 13 October, left the spa worse than when he arrived. His ill health was the worst he had ever experienced and continued until the start of 1866.

=== Continuing illness ===
Darwin desperately tried many different therapies, within the limitations of medical science of the time. He took all kinds of medicines, including bismuth compounds and laudanum, and even tried quack therapies, such as electrical stimulation of the abdomen with a shocking belt. On 16 May 1865, he wrote to John Chapman, who was now a qualified specialist in dyspepsia, sickness and psychological medicine. Chapman had sent Darwin a book about a therapy for seasickness of applying ice bags to the small of the back, and Darwin invited him to Down House to try out this therapy. In a manuscript dated 20 May 1865, thought to have been for Chapman, Darwin described his symptoms:

Age 56–57. – For 25 years extreme spasmodic daily & nightly flatulence: occasional vomiting, on two occasions prolonged during months. Vomiting preceded by shivering, hysterical crying, dying sensations or half-faint. & copious very palid urine. Now vomiting & every paroxys[m] of flatulence preceded by singing of ears, rocking, treading on air & vision. focus & black dots – All fatigues, specially reading, brings on these Head symptoms ?? nervousness when E[mma] leaves me ..." [the list continues]

In his autobiography of 1876, Darwin wrote of his illness, emphasising that it had been brought on by "the excitement" of socialising:

Few persons can have lived a more retired life than we have done. Besides short visits to the houses of relations, and occasionally to the seaside or elsewhere, we have gone nowhere. During the first part of our residence we went a little into society, and received a few friends here; but my health almost always suffered from the excitement, violent shivering and vomiting attacks being thus brought on. I have therefore been compelled for many years to give up all dinner-parties; and this has been somewhat of a deprivation to me, as such parties always put me into high spirits. From the same cause I have been able to invite here very few scientific acquaintances. My chief enjoyment and sole employment throughout life has been scientific work; and the excitement from such work makes me for the time forget, or drives quite away, my daily discomfort. I have therefore nothing to record during the rest of my life, except the publication of my several books. ...

== Possible causes ==
Medical science has tried repeatedly to pinpoint the etiology, and many hypotheses were made. They vary considerably in evidential support; several, including arsenic poisoning and lupus, have been largely abandoned in the subsequent literature, while others remain under active discussion. Proposed causes include:

- Asperger's syndrome (now known as autism spectrum disorder) or other pervasive developmental disorder
- Chagas disease
- Chronic fatigue syndrome
- Crohn's disease
- Cyclic vomiting syndrome
- Lactose intolerance
- Lupus erythematosus
- Mast cell activation syndrome
- Ménière's disease
- Orthostatic intolerance
- Panic disorder with agoraphobia
- Obsessive–compulsive disorder
- Postural orthostatic tachycardia syndrome
- Posttraumatic stress disorder
- Psychosomatic disease
- Tick-borne disease

Diagnoses for Darwin's illness have been uncritically reviewed from a chronological aspect with emphasis on the variety of these diagnoses. More recently, there has been a critical review with emphasis on the maternal (Wedgwood) family history as an indicator of the nature of the illness.

=== Psychic causation ===
Darwin found that his illness often followed stressful situations, such as the excitement of attending a meeting. Having escaped "smoky dirty London" to his country retreat of the former parsonage of Down House at Downe, he became increasingly reclusive, actually fitting a mirror outside the house, so that he could withdraw when visitors were coming around the corner. When he left, it was mostly to visit friends or relatives, though he did endeavour to meet his obligations to attend scientific meetings.

==== Diagnosis of panic disorder and agoraphobia ====
Barloon and Noyes^{1} report that as a young man, Darwin had "episodes of abdominal distress, especially in stressful situations". He had a "premorbid vulnerability" which was referred to as "sensitivity to stress of criticism in his youth". They contend that "variable intensity of symptoms and chronic, prolonged course without physical deterioration also indicate that his illness was psychiatric." Panic disorder usually appears in the teens or in early adulthood with an association with potentially stressful life transitions.^{2} The histories of panic disorder patients often include some type of separation from a person who is emotionally important to them, which may be significant as Darwin's mother died in 1817 when he was eight, though apparently Darwin had a happy childhood overall and was encouraged by his siblings. Bowlby suggested that separation anxiety may help cause the development of panic disorder in adulthood and that agoraphobic patients frequently describe parents as dominant, controlling, critical, frightening, rejecting, or overprotective, which matches (disputed) descriptions of Darwin's father as tyrannical (see below).

A study by Chambless and Mason^{3} says that regardless of gender, the less masculine in trait a person afflicted with panic disorder is, the more likely they are to use avoidance (social withdrawal) as a coping mechanism. Individuals who have more masculine traits often turn to external coping strategies (for example, alcohol). Bean^{4} wrote that while Darwin had great confidence, at the same time he was neurotic, became nervous when his routine was altered, and was upset by a holiday, trip, or unexpected visitor.

Colp^{5} disputes a diagnosis of agoraphobia, because Darwin dutifully attended 16 meetings of the Council of the Royal Society and was away from home about 2,000 days between 1842 and his death in 1882. However, Barloon and Noyes state that Darwin only left home infrequently, usually accompanied by his wife. They cite Darwin declining an invitation: "I have long found it impossible to visit anywhere; the novelty and excitement would annihilate me."^{1}

==== Relationship with father ====
Kempf^{6} imputes a psychic cause based on the theory of Oedipal complex, proposing that Darwin's illness was "an expression of repressed anger toward his father" (the physician Robert Darwin). Kempf believed that Darwin's "complete submission" to a tyrannical father prevented Darwin from expressing anger towards his father and then subsequently toward others. In a similar diagnosis, English psychiatrist Dr. Rankine Good stated, "Thus, if Darwin did not slay his father in the flesh, then he certainly slew the Heavenly Father in the realm of natural history," suffering for his "unconscious patricide" which accounted for "almost forty years of severe and crippling neurotic suffering." Sir Gavin de Beer disputed this explanation, claiming a physical causation.^{8}

Darwin's autobiography says of his father, "... [he] was a little unjust to me when I was young, but afterwards I am thankful to think that I became a prime favourite with him." Bradbury^{7} quotes J. Huxley and H.B.D. Kettlew: "The predisposing cause of any psychoneurosis which Charles Darwin displayed seems to have been the conflict and emotional tension springing from his ambivalent relations with his father ... whom he both revered and subconsciously resented." Bradbury also quotes John Chancellor's analysis: "... [Darwin's] obsessive desire to work and achieve something was prompted by hatred and resentment of his father, who had called him an idler and good-for-nothing during his youth."

Such psychoanalysis remains controversial, particularly when based only on writings.

==== Relationship with wife, nervousness about being left alone ====
Peter Brent writes in his biography of Darwin, Darwin: A Man of Enlarged Curiosity, that Charles and Emma Darwin's "ties to each other were linked to childhood and the very beginnings of memory. They had a common history, a joint tradition. It is hard to think their relationship a passionate one, but it was happy, and the happiness had deep roots." Bradbury^{7}—himself a social psychologist—draws on this biography to argue that in Darwin's letters, Emma was "always the mother, never the child, Darwin always the child, never the father." Darwin gave his wife the nickname "mammy", writing, "My dearest old Mammy ... Without you, when sick I feel most desolate ... Oh Mammy, I do long to be with you and under your protection for then I feel safe." Brent states that it is difficult to see that this is a thirty-nine-year-old man writing to his wife and not a young child writing to his mother. Barloon and Noyes^{1} quote Darwin's admission to Dr. Chapman of "nervousness when Emma leaves me", which they interpret as a fear of being alone associated with his panic disorder.

Like his mother, Darwin's wife Emma was devoutly Unitarian. His father, speaking from experience, warned Charles before he proposed to Emma that "some women suffered miserably by doubting about the salvation of their husbands, thus making them likewise to suffer." Darwin did tell Emma of his ideas at that stage, and, while she was deeply concerned about the danger to his afterlife expressed in the Gospel, "If a man abide not in me...they are burned", she married him and remained fully supportive of his work throughout their marriage. She read and helped with his "Essay" setting out his theory in 1844, long before he showed his theory to anyone else. She went through the pages, making notes in the margins pointing out unclear passages and showing where she disagreed. As his illness progressed, she nursed him, restraining him from overworking and making him take holiday breaks, always helping him to continue with his work.

==== Religious tension ====
Darwin had a complex relationship to religion. The Darwin–Wedgwood family were of the Unitarian church, with his grandfather Erasmus Darwin and father taking this to the extent of Freethought, but, in the repressive climate of the early 19th century, his father complied with the Anglican Church of England.

Charles Darwin's education at school was Anglican, then after in Edinburgh, he joined student societies where his tutors espoused Lamarckian materialism. He liked the thought of becoming a country clergyman, and before studying at the University of Cambridge, "as I did not then in the least doubt the strict and literal truth of every word in the Bible, I soon persuaded myself that our Creed must be fully accepted." The clergyman naturalist professors there who became his lifelong friends fully accepted an ancient earth but opposed evolutionism which they felt would undermine the social order. He did well at theology and, in his finals, came 10th out of a pass list of 178. At both universities, he saw how evolution was associated with radicals and democrats seeking to overthrow society and how publicly supporting such ideas could lead to destruction of reputation, loss of position and even imprisonment for blasphemy.

At Cambridge, he was convinced by William Paley's writings of design by a Creator, but, on the Beagle expedition, his findings contradicted Paley's beneficent view. On his return, his deepening speculations led to the inception of Darwin's theory, and he increasingly disbelieved in the Bible, gradually becoming what was later termed an agnostic.

Darwin was clearly worried by the implications of his ideas and desperate to avoid distress to his naturalist friends and to his wife. When first telling his friends, he wrote "it is like confessing a murder", and his writings at the time of the publication of Darwin's theory suggest emotional turmoil. What is unclear is whether this was anxiety about disgrace and damage to his friends, or about his loss of faith in Christianity, or indeed a rational fear of the harsh treatment he had seen meted out to radicals and proponents of evolutionism.

=== The Chagas hypothesis ===
Advanced for the first time in 1959 by eminent Israeli specialist in tropical medicine Dr. Saul Adler from Hebrew University, the hypothesis of Chagas disease rests on Darwin's documented exposure to the insect vector of Trypanosoma cruzi near Mendoza in March 1835, and on the compatibility of some later symptoms, particularly chronic cardiac failure and autonomic gastrointestinal dysfunction, with chronic infection. The hypothesis has attracted sustained attention but faces substantial counter-evidence, and the current weight of opinion treats it as, at most, a contributing factor rather than a primary explanation.

During the Beagle expedition, Darwin was bitten by the insect vector of this disease near Mendoza to the east of the Argentinian Andes while on one of his land exploration trips. He noted in his journal for 26 March 1835:

At night I experienced an attack, & it deserves no less a name, of the Benchuca, the great black bug of the Pampas. It is most disgusting to feel soft wingless insects, about an inch long, crawling over ones body; before sucking they are quite thin, but afterwards round & bloated with blood, & in this state they are easily squashed.

The great black bug of the Pampas is identified by Richard Keynes as Triatoma infestans, commonly called winchuka (vinchuca), one of the triatomine vectors for Trypanosoma cruzi which leads to Chagas disease. It is unlikely that Darwin was infected on this occasion as he did not mention having a fever in the days following the incident, but it is possible that he could have been infected in September 1834 when he recorded being ill but made no note about being bitten by a Benchuca at that time. Modelling of triatomine geographical distribution in Chile shows that Darwin traveled extensively in the areas of central and northern Chile where these bugs occur, sleeping outdoors and in rural houses.

Arguments for the Chagas hypothesis were mainly his gastric symptoms and some of his nervous signs and symptoms (caused in Chagas by an imbalance of the autonomic nervous system), malaise and fatigue, as well as his ultimate cause of death, which seems to have been chronic cardiac failure (present in ca. 20% of Chagas patients, with cardiomegaly and ventricular tip aneurysm) accompanied by lung edema.

Evidences against the Chagas hypothesis are numerous, however:

- Darwin died at a relatively old age for his time (73 years old);
- The symptoms abated as he aged, which is not typical for the disease, where age exacerbates the symptoms;
- He did not seem to have several of the pathological damages present at chronic Chagas disease, such as megacolon and megaesophagus;
- Some of the symptoms, such as tachycardia, fatigue and tremors, were already present before the Beagle voyage;
- The numerous partial exacerbations and remissions are unusual in Chagas disease;
- The incidence of trypanosome-infested benchucas in Mendoza, Argentina (which has a colder climate), where Darwin reported the bite, is very low;
- No other members of Beagle's crew who accompanied Darwin in his land trip showed signs of a similar disease;

Recently, unsuccessful requests were made to test Darwin's remains for T. cruzi DNA at the Westminster Abbey by using modern PCR techniques but were met with a refusal by the Abbey's curator. The attempt was the subject of a recent documentary of Discovery Health Channel.

Taken together, these objections do not exclude the possibility of T. cruzi infection, but they are sufficient to rule out Chagas disease as a single unifying diagnosis.

=== Mitochondrial DNA abnormalities (CVS/ MELAS) ===
The pathologist John A. Hayman of the University of Melbourne has presented a case that Darwin's symptoms indicate that he suffered from cyclic vomiting syndrome (CVS), an illness associated with mitochondrial DNA abnormalities. His paper on the topic was accepted by the BMJ and the Medical Journal of Australia, and was published in December 2009. In a supplement published in February 2012, he proposed that stroke-like episodes of memory loss and partial paralysis which do not occur with CVS are characteristic of the MELAS syndrome. An A3243G mtDNA mutation has been found in 80% of patients with this syndrome, and has also been described in those with CVS. This mutation in mitochondria is associated with symptoms of intestinal problems, seasickness and Ménière's disease as well as CVS and MELAS syndrome, thus giving a shared source of the various problems that affected Darwin. Any mitochondrial disease would have been inherited from his mother Susannah Darwin, whose own mother had 8 other children. Some of them had illnesses which could have been related to the same mutation.

CVS was also proposed as part of the cause in a 2011 analysis by gastroenterologist Sidney Cohen of the medical college of Thomas Jefferson University in Philadelphia. His study explained the illness as being due to a combination of cyclic vomiting syndrome, Chagas disease, and Helicobacter pylori.

=== Other possible causes ===
Evidence for familial systemic lactose intolerance syndrome was that vomiting and gastrointestinal symptoms usually appeared two to three hours after meals and that, apparently, Darwin got better when he stopped taking milk or cream.

Food intolerance and lactase deficiency may also be confused with food allergies. Symptoms include difficulty swallowing and breathing, nausea, vomiting, diarrhea, and abdominal pain. Upon reaching several other organs in the body, allergens can cause hives, eczema, lightheadedness, weakness, hypotension, etc. This has been proposed as the source of Darwin's illness, but the hypothesis is improbable, because, as with lactose intolerance, its temporal and causal relationship with food is easily established, and this was not always the case.

Chronic arsenic poisoning (arsenicosis) has been considered too. This hypothesis has been advanced by John H. Winslow, who published a book arguing that Darwin took arsenic at low dosages as a remedy and that there was "a very close match" between his symptoms and those of arsenicosis. However, it is highly improbable too, due to the long duration of the illness (40 years), the abruptness of symptoms, the cause of his death, and the absence of many symptoms and signs of this kind of poisoning (persistent weight loss and diarrhea, the appearance of dark brown calluses on the palms and the soles of the feet and of skin, known as hyperpigmentation).

Barry Marshall proposed in February 2009 that the cause of Darwin's illness was the ulcer-causing bacterium Helicobacter pylori. Marshall, who together with Robin Warren won the Nobel Prize in 2005 for discovery of the bacterium, states that this was a very common gastric infection of the time which causes ulcers in 10% of infected persons and causes dyspepsia in another 10% or so. He had yet to have a short paper on this accepted for publication.

=== Combined causes ===
From a clinical point of view, perhaps Darwin suffered from more than one disease, and had many psychosomatic complications and phobias arising from his debilitating condition. This is known to happen with many patients today, such as in severe cases of panic disorder, usually accompanied by hypochondria and depression.

Dr. Peter Medawar has supported the diagnosis that Darwin's health problems were part organic, part psychological. Colp^{5} concluded that Darwin's illness consisted most probably of panic disorder without agoraphobia, psychosomatic skin disorder, and possibly Chagas disease of the stomach, which he suggested "was first active and then became inactive, permanently injuring the parasympathetic nerves of his stomach and making it more sensitive to sympathetic stimulation and hence more sensitive to the psychosomatic impact of his anxieties. An organic impairment best explains the lifelong chronicity of many of his abdominal complaints." Thus, the psychological aspects of Darwin's illness might be both a cause and an effect of Darwin's illness. D.A.B. Young wrote in a Royal Society journal in 1997 that the psychogenic view of Darwin's sickness "holds the field". The proponent of Chagas disease, Dr. Saul Adler, stated that Darwin may have suffered both from Chagas disease and from "an innate or acquired neurosis".

At a conference hosted by the University of Maryland, Baltimore, School of Medicine on the topic of Darwin's ailments, gastroenterologist Dr. Sidney Cohen of Thomas Jefferson University concluded that in his early years Darwin had suffered cyclic vomiting syndrome, but as he had brought up secretions such as stomach acid rather than food, this had not affected his weight and nutrition. He believed that Chagas disease contracted during the Beagle voyage was consistent with Darwin's account of his fever at that time and his later gastrointestinal complaints, as well as the heart disease later in life that led to Darwin's death. In addition, Helicobacter pylori which often occurs with Chagas would have caused Darwin to have peptic ulcer disease.

== Hereditary disease ==
Many of Darwin's children suffered from similarly vague illnesses for much of their early lives. Darwin himself—concerned with heredity—wondered if he had passed on his generally infirm condition to his children, and was especially interested if their mother Emma Wedgwood, his cousin, was also responsible. His concerns later in life with the effects of inbreeding were potentially motivated by this personal aspect as well.

Charles Darwin's children's illnesses differed essentially from those of their father's. They were sickly as children; however those that survived infancy and childhood grew into healthy adults. Darwin himself was a healthy child with no record of illness; it was only as an adolescent that first symptoms of his illness are mentioned.

== Contribution to Darwin's work ==
George Pickering, in his book Creative Malady (1974), suggested Darwin's illness may have contributed to his long and fruitful career in science. He wrote that Darwin—isolated from social life and obligations of a "normal" scientist, such as administrative and teaching work—had ample time and material comforts for research, thought, and writing extensively, which he did. Despite long periods of unproductivity due to ill health, he produced much research. Darwin often complained that his malady robbed him of half a lifetime, but even so, Pickering noted that his scientific contributions can be compared favorably to those of such figures as Isaac Newton and Albert Einstein.

Darwin himself wrote about this, in his autobiographical "Recollections of the Development of my Mind and Character" (1876):

Lastly, I have had ample leisure from not having to earn my own bread. Even ill-health, though it has annihilated several years of my life, has saved me from the distractions of society and amusement.
