= Buckston Browne =

British urologist (1850–1945)

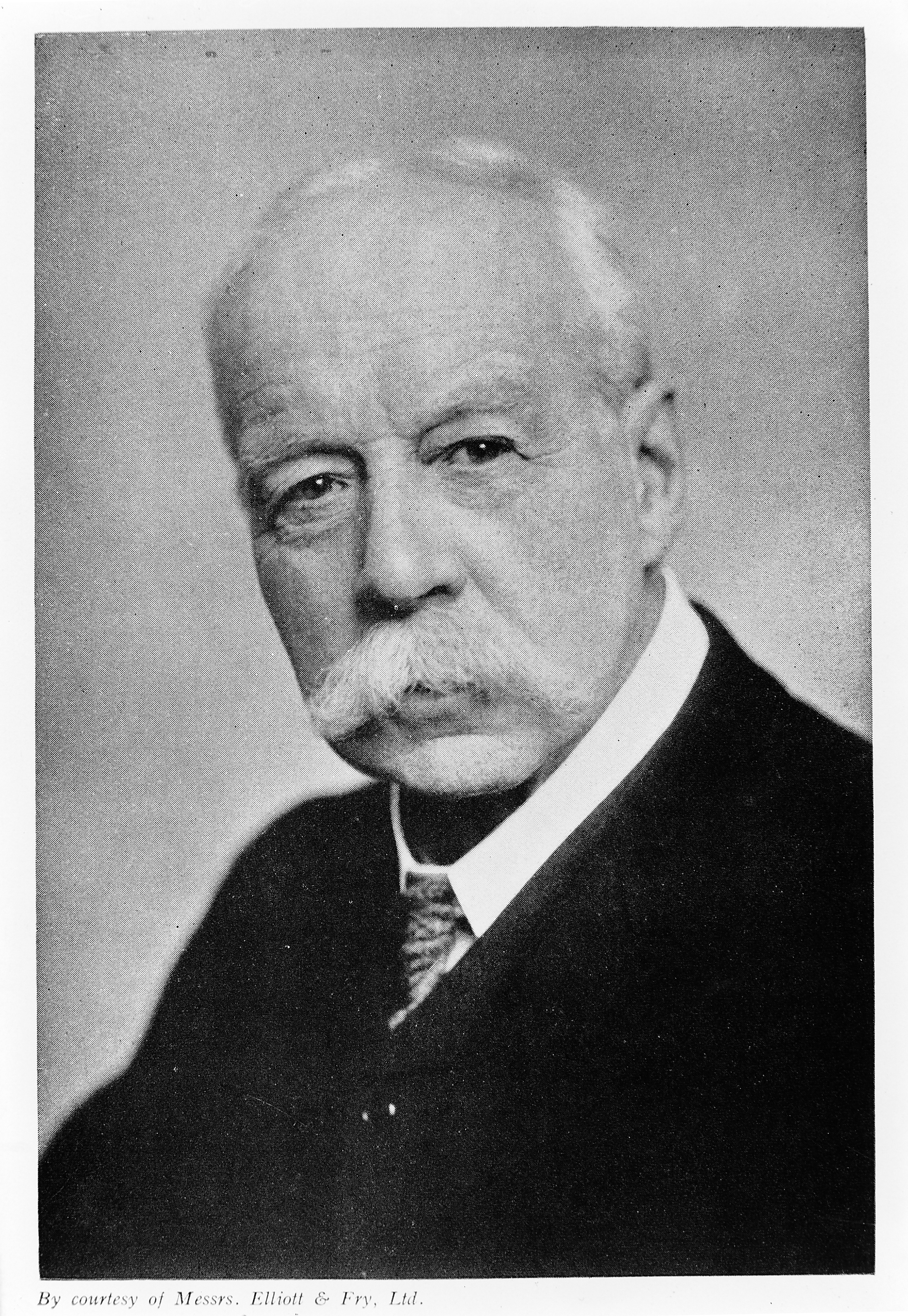
Browne

Sir George Buckston Browne FRCS (13 April 1850 – 19 January 1945) was a British surgeon and pioneer urologist.

Browne was born in Manchester, the son of physician Dr. Henry Browne. He was educated at University College London.

In 1927, he bought Charles Darwin's former home Down House and founded the Buckston Brown Research Farm in Downe in 1931. The Buckston Browne Prize is named for him.

He died at University College Hospital in London, aged 94.
