= Down House =

Former home of Charles Darwin

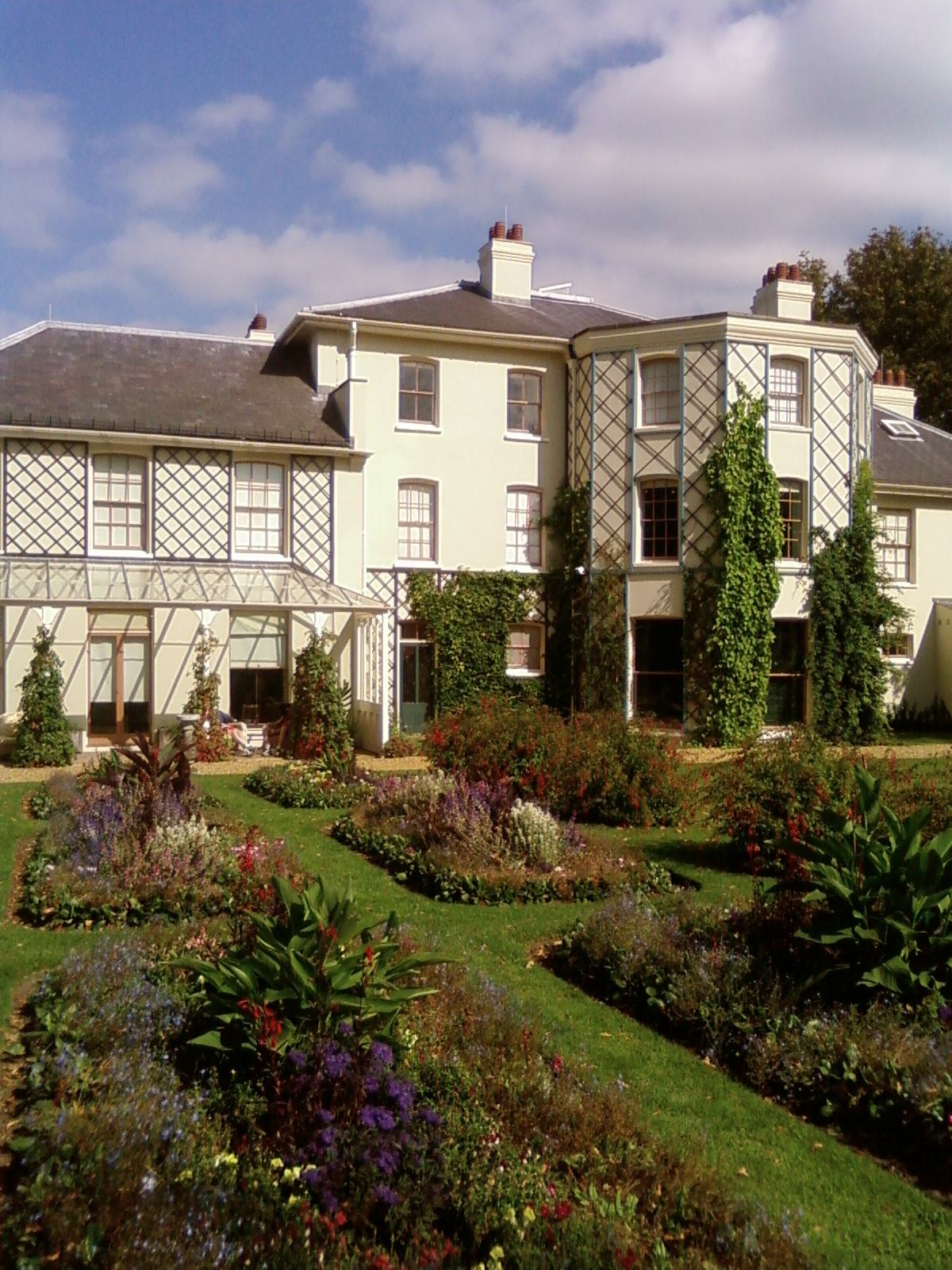

- Location within London Borough of Bromley
- 51°19′53″N 0°3′12″E
- Location: Luxted Road, Downe, BR6 7JT

Site notes
- Area: London Borough of Bromley
- Owner: English Heritage

Listed Building – Grade I
- Official name: Down House
- Designated: 31 May 1954
- Reference no.: 1038325

Down House is the former home of the English naturalist Charles Darwin and his family. It was in this house and garden that Darwin worked on his theory of evolution by natural selection, which he had conceived in London before moving to Down.

The Grade I listed building stands in Luxted Road, one-quarter mile (400 m) south of Downe, a village 14 1/4 miles (23 km) south-east of London's Charing Cross. The village was known as Down when Darwin moved there in 1842. In his day, Downe was a parish in Kent. Since 1965, it has lain within the London Borough of Bromley.

The house, garden and grounds are in the guardianship of English Heritage. They have been restored and are open to the public.

== History ==
=== 1651–1842: early history ===
In 1651, Thomas Manning sold a parcel of land including most of the current property to John Know the elder, from a Kentish yeoman family, for £345 (equivalent to £56,052 today). It has been debated whether this price is likely to have included a house, but, if not, it was Know who built the first farmhouse on the property: some surviving flint walls may date from this period. In 1653, John Know gave the house to his son Roger, probably as a wedding present; and in 1743, the marriage of Mary Know passed the property to the family of Bartholomew of West Peckham in the Weald. In 1751, Leonard Bartholomew sold the uninhabited house on to Charles Hayes of Hatton Garden.

The property was acquired by the businessman and landowner George Butler in 1778, and it is thought that he rebuilt and enlarged the house: in 1781, he paid the highest window tax in the village. Around this time, it was apparently called the Great House. After Butler died in 1783, the property changed hands several times, then in 1819, it went to Lieut.-Col. John Johnson, C.B., colonel of engineers in the Hon. East India Company, Bombay establishment. In 1837, Johnson migrated to "Lake Erie near Dunville in Upper Canada", and passed what was now called Down House on to the incumbent parson of the parish, the Rev. James Drummond. The house was re-roofed and brought into good order under the supervision of Edward Cresy, an architect who lived nearby. Around 1840, Drummond left the property vacant and put it up for auction, but it was unsold and lay empty for two years.

=== 1842–1906: Darwin occupancy ===
The Darwin family in 1841 were finding their London house increasingly cramped: both Charles and his wife Emma also preferred living in the countryside, as they were disturbed by the constant noise and severe coal smoke air pollution of central London, and they had two young children, William (b. 1839) and Anne (b. 1841). Darwin approached his father Robert Darwin for financing, and with the caution that he should try living in an area for some time before being committed to a move, was given approval to start house hunting. Charles and Emma sought somewhere about 20 miles (32 km) from London with railway access, such as Windsor, Berkshire, and came close to buying one near Chobham, Surrey.

On Friday 22 July 1842, Charles and Emma visited Down House. They slept at a little "pot-house" in the village, which was also "a grocers-shop & the land-lord is the carpenter", and returned to London on Saturday afternoon, then on the Sunday Darwin wrote to tell his sister of their first impressions. Though there were plenty of trains on the 10 miles (16 km) line from London to the nearest station, from there it was a long, slow and hilly 8.5 miles (13.7 km) drive to Downe. The small, quiet village was away from main roads, and though local scenery was beautiful on a good day, the house "being situated on rather high table-land, has somewhat of desolate air ... The charm of the place to me is that almost every field is intersected (as alas is our's) by one or more foot-paths—I never saw so many walks in any other country".

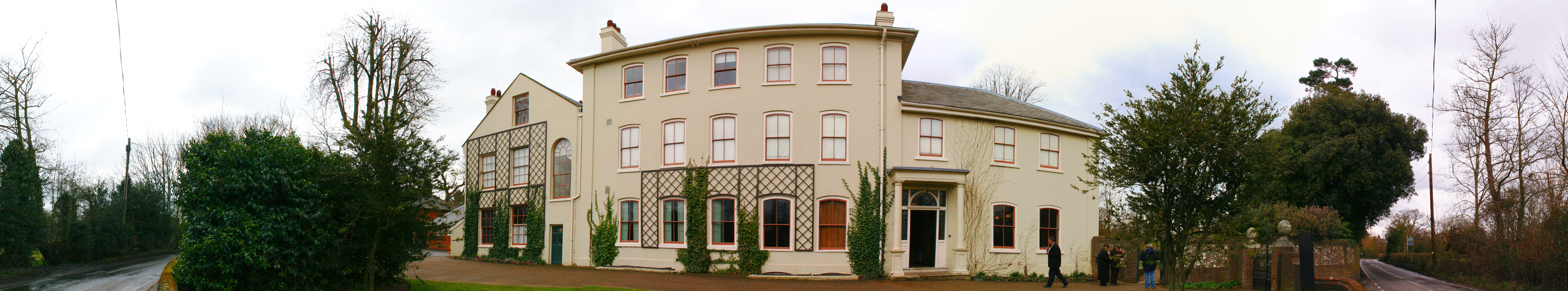
The east side of the house is close to a narrow lane: the central block was the original house, the service wing to its left was extended with a schoolroom and bedrooms above the kitchen. The 1877 extension to the right included a new main entrance.

The three-storey house itself stood "very badly close to a tiny lane & near another man's field", and was "ugly, looks neither old nor new" but on the ground floor it had a "Capital study" and a dining room facing east, and a large drawing room facing west, with plenty of bedrooms upstairs. Darwin believed that the price was about £2,200 (equivalent to £215,090 in present-day terms) and he could lease it for one year to try it out.

That Friday was cold and gloomy, and Emma was at first disappointed with the "desolate" scenery as well as being "dreadfully bad with toothache, headache", that evening, but liked the house and grounds better than Charles, finding it "not too near or too far from other houses". On the Saturday the weather changed, and "she was so delighted with the scenery for the first few miles from Down, that it has worked great change in her".

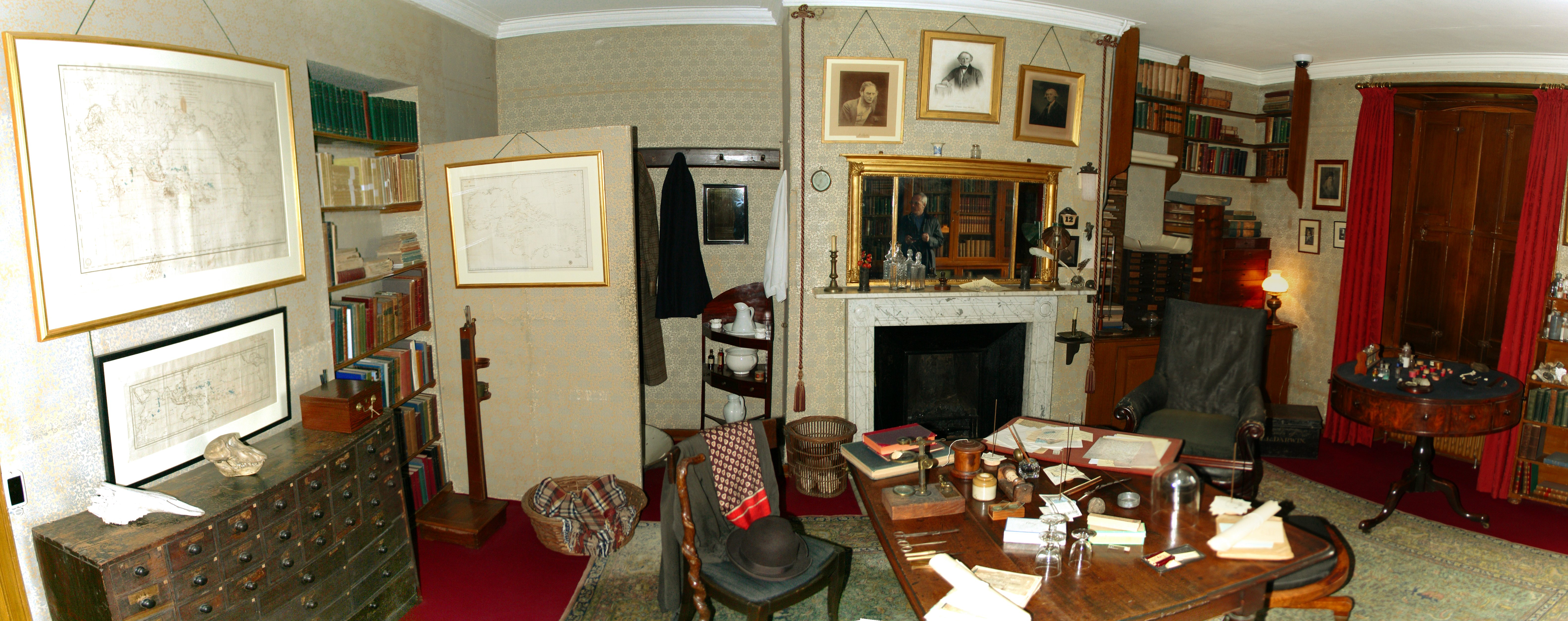
Charles Darwin's study at Down House, restored with original furniture including his wheeled armchair and writing board. On the right, two (shuttered) windows look east, and Darwin had an angled mirror fixed outside to see who was coming up the drive to the entrance.

The house had obvious faults, but they were both weary of house-hunting, and it was cheap. Emma preferred a more expensive house in Surrey, and may have hoped that Darwin's father would increase the loan, but life in crowded dirty London was becoming more unpleasant and she was pregnant so unable to continue the search that year.

With advice from the architect and surveyor Edward Cresy, Darwin opened negotiations, but the Rev. James Drummond refused to lease the property and wanted £2,500 to pay off his mortgage on it. Cresy suggested a bid of £2,100, but Darwin remembered an unsuccessful earlier attempt at purchase, and made an offer of about £2,200 which was accepted. At the end of August they were almost ready to move, and Emma moved in on 14 September 1842, followed by Charles three days later. Emma gave birth to Mary Eleanor on 23 September, and they were all getting on well—even Darwin's brother Erasmus, who had said the place should be called "Down-in-the-Mouth", had altered his opinion—but they were saddened when baby Mary died on 16 October.

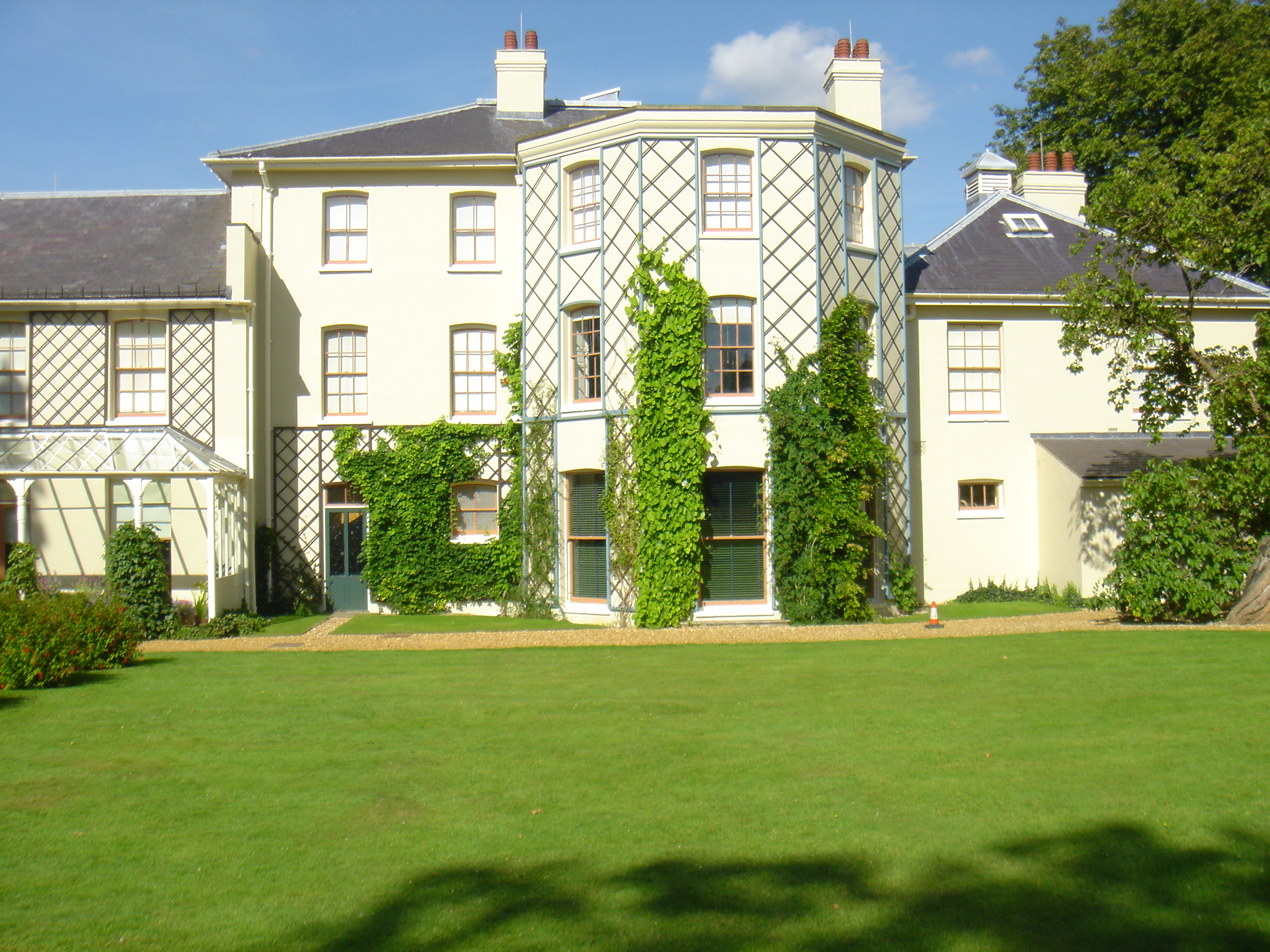
The west front of Down House looks out onto its gardens, and the main block is dominated by the angled walls of the bay extension Darwin had built in 1843. The kitchen wing to the right has a classroom on the upper floor, and the block to the left, added in 1858, has a drawing room behind the glazed roofed verandah.

Darwin made extensive alterations to the house and grounds. An angled bay forming a large bow front extending up through all three storeys at the west elevation of the house extended the drawing room and rooms over it, giving improved views and lighting: Darwin wrote telling his cousin that the first brick was laid on 27 March 1843. By 27 April, work was in hand to lower the lane by as much as 2 feet (0.61 m) and build new flint boundary walls, which together with earth mounds and shrubbery made the east garden more private. A strip of the field was made into a kitchen garden including the experimental plot of ground, and later the greenhouses.

In September 1843, the Darwin family increased with the birth of "Etty" in the house, where all their remaining children were born: George in 1845, "Bessy" in 1847, Francis in 1848, Leonard in 1850, Horace in 1851, and their 10th child Charles Waring Darwin who was born in 1856, but died in 1858.

Between 1845 and 1846, Darwin altered the service wing to the south of the main block, getting the kitchen area rebuilt with the addition of a butler's pantry, and a schoolroom and two small bedrooms on upper floors. The outhouses were rebuilt, and a mound to the west side was removed with a new mound being added to the east to give protection from the wind.

On their first visit, Darwin had noted that "The great Astronomer Sir J. Lubbock is owner of 3000 acres [12 km^{2}] here, & is building a grand house a mile off", but thought that he would be too reserved or proud to visit them. In fact, Sir John William Lubbock had brought home a "great piece of news", and while his son was initially disappointed that the news was just that Darwin was coming to Down House and not a new pony, young John Lubbock soon became close friends with Darwin and a frequent visitor to Down House.

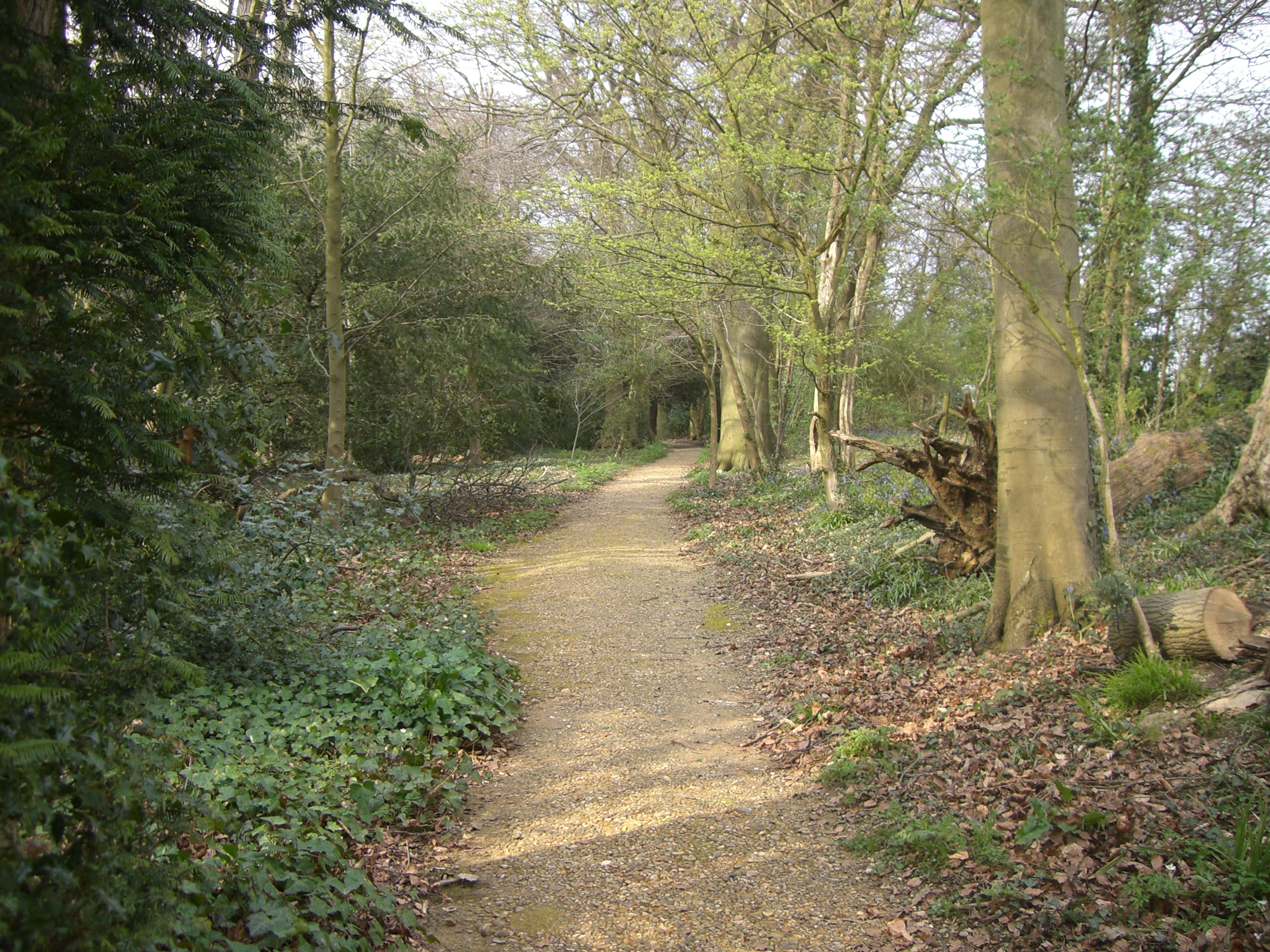
The sandwalk, Darwin's thinking path.

In 1846, Darwin rented from Sir John William Lubbock a narrow strip of land of 1.5 acres (0.61 ha) adjoining the Down House grounds to the southwest, and had it planted. He named it the Sandwalk Wood. One side was shaded by an old shaw with oak trees, and the other looked over a hedge to a charming valley. Darwin had a variety of trees planted, and ordered a gravel path known as the "sandwalk" to be created around the perimeter. Darwin's daily walk of several circuits of this path served both for exercise and for uninterrupted thinking. He set up a number of small stones at one point on the walk so that he could kick a stone to the side each time he passed, so that he did not have to interrupt his thoughts by consciously counting the number of circuits he had made that day. The sandwalk also served as a playground for his children. A wooden summerhouse was built at the lower end of the sandwalk. In 1874, Darwin gave a piece of pasture land to Sir John Lubbock (the son) in exchange for ownership of the Sandwalk Wood. From 1849, Darwin used it to continue his walking exercise on return from Dr. Gully's hydrotherapy treatment.

A new extension at the north end of the house was added in 1858, providing a large new drawing room facing west which became a comfortable family room, and two bedrooms over. The former drawing room was converted into a new dining room, and the old dining room next to the kitchen became a billiard room.

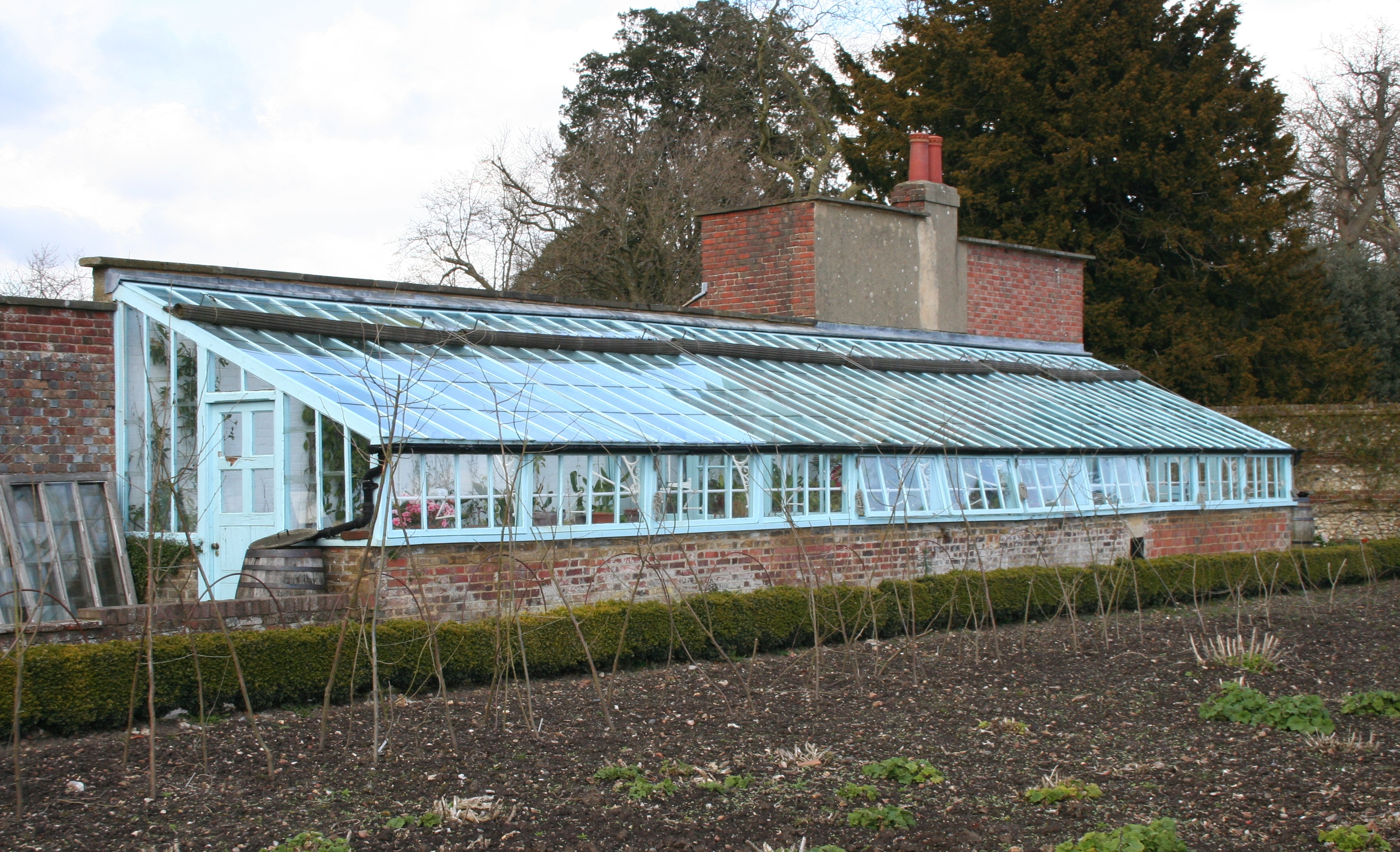
Darwin's greenhouse at Down House where he conducted many experiments

Darwin's interest in the fertilisation of orchids led him to get a new heated greenhouse constructed under the supervision of John Horwood, the gardener of Mr Turnbull at The Rookery: this was completed in February 1863. It includes a tunnel passageway that allows bees to fly in and out. Darwin spent 16 years growing sundews and other carnivorous plants in his greenhouse, feeding them proteins like roast beef and boiled egg. This research became the basis for his pioneering book Insectivorous Plants (1875).

In 1872, a verandah was added to the west side of the new drawing room, and in 1877, a new billiard room was added to the east of this block, with the hallway being extended to form a new entrance hall and Georgian-style porch facing east. The new billiard room was converted to a new study in 1881, and the old study where Darwin wrote On the Origin of Species was converted into a smoking room. In the same year, Darwin bought a strip of land to the north of the property, beyond his orchard, and had a hard tennis court and a new wall built.

After the death of Frank's first wife Amy, their son Bernard Darwin was brought up by Charles and Emma at Down. Charles Darwin died at the house on 19 April 1882, aged 73. Emma also died there in 1896.

In February 1897, the house was advertised to be let, furnished, at a rent of "12 guineas per week, including gardeners". From 1900 to 1906, George Darwin rented the house out to a Mr. Whitehead, who was the first owner of a motor car in Downe.

=== 1907–1922: Downe School for Girls ===
A girls' boarding school was established at the house in February 1907, co-founded by the headmistress Olive Willis (1877–1964) with her friend Alice Carver. The school began with five mistresses and one girl, but was soon successful and grew to around 60 pupils. Various corrugated iron outbuildings were erected around the house at this time, to serve as the school's chapel, gymnasium, music-rooms and lavatories: these were later removed. The school occupied the house until 1 April 1922, when it moved to larger premises at Hermitage Rd, Cold Ash, Newbury, where it remains. The present school is still named Downe House School, and one of its houses is still named Darwin. The novelist Elizabeth Bowen, who was a pupil at the school during the First World War, wrote after revisiting Down House in the 1930s: "I have never liked scientific people very much, and it mortifies me to think of them trampling reverently around there on visiting days, thinking of Charles Darwin and ignorant of my own youth."

=== 1927–1996: Darwin Museum ===
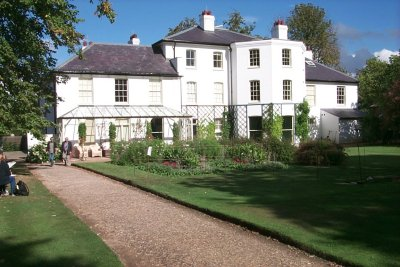
Down House today as a museum.

From 1924, another girls' school was run in the house by a Miss Rain, but this was unsuccessful and closed in 1927. Following an appeal at that year's Annual Meeting of the British Association for the Advancement of Science by its president Sir Arthur Keith, the surgeon Sir George Buckston Browne (1850–1945) bought Down from the Darwin heirs for £4,250 in 1927 (equivalent to £230,842 in present-day terms). He spent about £10,000 on repairs and on 7 January 1929 presented it to the British Association together with an endowment of £20,000 to ensure its preservation in perpetuity as a memorial to Darwin, to be used for the benefit of science and open to visitors free of charge. Down House was formally opened to the public as a museum at a tea on 7 June 1929. In 1931, Buckston Browne gave the Royal College of Surgeons of England (RCS England) an endowment fund and land adjacent to the Down House property to establish the Buckston Browne Research Farm, a surgical research station. For his efforts in saving the historic house, Buckston Browne received a knighthood in the 1932 New Year Honours.

Buckston Browne's endowment for the house proved insufficient and the expense of maintenance led to the British Association in turn donating the house to the RCS England in October 1953. In 1962, Sir Hedley Atkins (1905–1983), later President of the RCS England, moved into the house together with his wife and assumed the role of honorary curator.

In May 1954, Down House itself was designated as a Grade I listed building, and in September 1988 the garden and Sandwalk were added to the Register of Parks and Gardens of Special Historic Interest in England at Grade II.

=== 1996 to present: restored house and garden ===
Down House was acquired in 1996 by English Heritage, with a grant from the Wellcome Trust. It was restored with funds raised by the Natural History Museum from many trusts, and from a grant from the Heritage Lottery Fund, and reopened to the public in April 1998. In 2009, the Darwin Bicentenary Project created a new exhibition on the first floor of the house, telling the story of Darwin's life and work. A video guide outside focuses on how Darwin used his garden as an outdoor laboratory and features clips from David Attenborough, Professor Steve Jones and Melvyn Bragg. Darwin's notebooks were digitised using Turning the Pages software and put online.

Down House and the surrounding area has been nominated by the UK government's Department for Culture, Media and Sport (DCMS) to become a World Heritage Site. It originally went through public consultation in 2006 and a decision had been expected in the last three days of June 2007. However, ICOMOS warned the DCMS that the House might not meet the criteria for scientific sites on the register, and so in May 2007, the DCMS announced that it was withdrawing the bid with the intention of resubmitting it later. The bid was resubmitted unsuccessfully in January 2009.

The master bedroom was restored, and opened to the public for the first time in June 2016. The restoration included a reconstruction of the Darwins' collection of fine art prints, with Biblical scenes by Raphael, Titian, and Sebastiano del Piombo, as well as a Raphael self-portrait in the bedroom, and a self-portrait by Leonardo da Vinci in Darwin's study together with portraits of Charles Lyell and Erasmus Darwin.

== Visiting ==
Down House, its garden and grounds are open to the public daily from April to October; from November through to March, it opens on weekends. The house and garden undergoes routine conservation work during its closed periods.

The house can be reached by public transport from central London, as it is located within Transport for London travel Zone 6. The 146 bus service from Bromley North railway station (daily) terminates nearby at Downe Village, and the R8 bus from Orpington railway station (excluding Sundays) stops on request outside Down House. The closest Tramlink station is New Addington.

== See also ==
- The Mount, Shrewsbury
- Historic houses in England
- List of English Heritage properties
- Museums in England
