= The Life of Erasmus Darwin =

Book by Erasmus Darwin

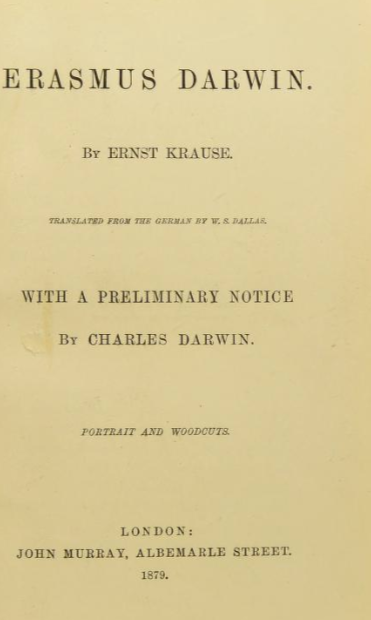
- Title page for Erasmus Darwin (1879)
- Author: Ernst Krause
- Subject: Erasmus Darwin
- Genre: Biography
- Publication date: 1879

The Life of Erasmus Darwin is the 1879 biography of Erasmus Darwin (1731-1802) by his grandson Charles Darwin and the German biologist Ernst Krause.

Ernst Krause wrote a paper on the scientific works of Erasmus Darwin which was published in the German-language journal Kosmos in February 1879. This was translated into English by William Sweetland Dallas as "The Scientific Works of Erasmus Darwin" (pages 130–216 in the original edition), and Charles Darwin added a "preliminary notice" based on material that was in the possession of his family (pages 1–127).

Before publication however 16% of the work was cut out by Charles' daughter Henrietta Litchfield — mostly the most provocative parts. It was also published in German as Erasmus Darwin und seine Stellung in der Geschichte der Descendenz-Theorie von Ernst Krause. Mit seinem Lebens- und Charakterbilde von Charles Darwin ("Erasmus Darwin and his place in the history of the theory of descent by Ernst Krause. With his life and character by Charles Darwin"). A second (English) edition, edited by Charles Darwin's son Francis was published in 1887. An unabridged edition edited by Desmond King-Hele was published in 2003 to mark the 200th anniversary since Erasmus' death.

Krause made some alterations and additions to his paper before it was translated, indirectly referring to Samuel Butler's book Evolution Old and New. Butler took exception to not being properly attributed, and this resulted in a "sordid and one-sided quarrel in which Darwin remained silent"
