= Richard Buckley Litchfield =

British scholar and philanthropist

- Born: 6 January 1832; Yarpole
- Died: 11 January 1903 (aged 71); Cannes
- Spouse: Henrietta Litchfield

Richard Buckley Litchfield (6 January 1832 – 11 January 1903) was a British scholar and philanthropist.

== Life ==
R. B. Litchfield was the only son of Captain Richard Litchfield of Cheltenham, England. He was educated at Cheltenham College and Trinity College, Cambridge, where he became a friend of James Clerk Maxwell, and where he then taught mathematics. He was admitted to the Inner Temple in 1854, and was called to the Bar in 1863.

He was a founder of the Working Men's College, London, where he worked devotedly from 1854 to 1901, being the College's Bursar, and becoming its Vice Principal between 1872 and 1875. In the mid-1850s he was editor of the College magazine.

Litchfield was a fellow Working Men's College colleague of John Ruskin. He married a daughter of Charles Darwin, Henrietta Emma ('Etty') Darwin, in 1871, but there were no children from the marriage. He wrote a substantial biography of the inventor of photography, Thomas Wedgwood, which was published in the year of his death.

In his niece-by-marriage Gwen Raverat's Period Piece, she described him thus: "He was a nice funny little man, whose socks were always coming down; he had an egg-shaped waistcoat, and a fuzzy, waggly, whitey-brown beard, which was quite indistinguishable, both in colour and texture, from the Shetland shawl which Aunt Etty generally made him wear round his neck."

He lived at 31 Kensington Square, London; he died on 11 January 1903, and is buried in the English part of the Cemetery « LE GRAND JAS » in Cannes, France. The exact location of the grave is "Cimetière du Grand Jas, 18ème allée (ex-Protestant) n°44"; the inscription on his gravestone reads: "He prayeth best who loveth best, all things both great and small" (taken from Samuel Taylor Coleridge's The Ancient Mariner poem ) - and - "A founder of the Working Men's College, London where he devotedly worked for nearly fifty years."

== Works ==
- The Beginnings of the Working Men's College. London, England, 1902
- Tom Wedgwood, the First Photographer: An Account of His Life. London, Duckworth and Co, 1903.
