= Henrietta Litchfield =

Editor, daughter of Charles Darwin

- Litchfield with her brother William Erasmus Darwin around 1905
- Born: Henrietta Emma Darwin; 25 September 1843; Down House, Downe, Kent, England
- Died: 17 December 1927 (aged 84); Burrows Hill, Gomshall, Surrey, England
- Burial place: St Mary the Virgin Churchyard, Downe
- Spouse: Richard Buckley Litchfield
- Parent(s): Charles Darwin; Emma Wedgwood
- Relatives: See Darwin–Wedgwood family

Henrietta Emma Litchfield (née Darwin; 25 September 1843 – 17 December 1927) was the daughter of Charles Darwin and his wife Emma Wedgwood. She was also nicknamed Etty.

Henrietta was born at Down House, Downe, Kent, in 1843. She was Darwin's third daughter and the eldest daughter to reach adulthood after the eldest, Annie, died aged 10, and a second daughter, Mary, died before she was a month old. She and her brother Frank helped their father with his work, and Henrietta helped edit The Descent of Man.

On 31 August 1871, she married Richard Buckley Litchfield, who was born in Yarpole, near Leominster, in 1832; the couple had no children. She was widowed on 11 January 1903, when Richard died in Cannes, France; he was buried in the English Cemetery, Cannes.

Henrietta edited Charles Darwin's biography of his grandfather Erasmus Darwin, The Life of Erasmus Darwin, and The Autobiography of Charles Darwin, removing several contentious passages. She also edited her mother's private papers (Emma Darwin: A Century of Family Letters) (1904). She responded to the Lady Hope Story that her father had undergone a deathbed conversion by writing an article in The Christian in 1922 saying it "[had] no foundation whatsoever". She died in Burrows Hill, Gomshall, Surrey, aged 84. An obituary was in The Times. She is buried in St Mary the Virgin Churchyard, Downe, Kent.
