= Social history of the piano =

History of the piano's role in society

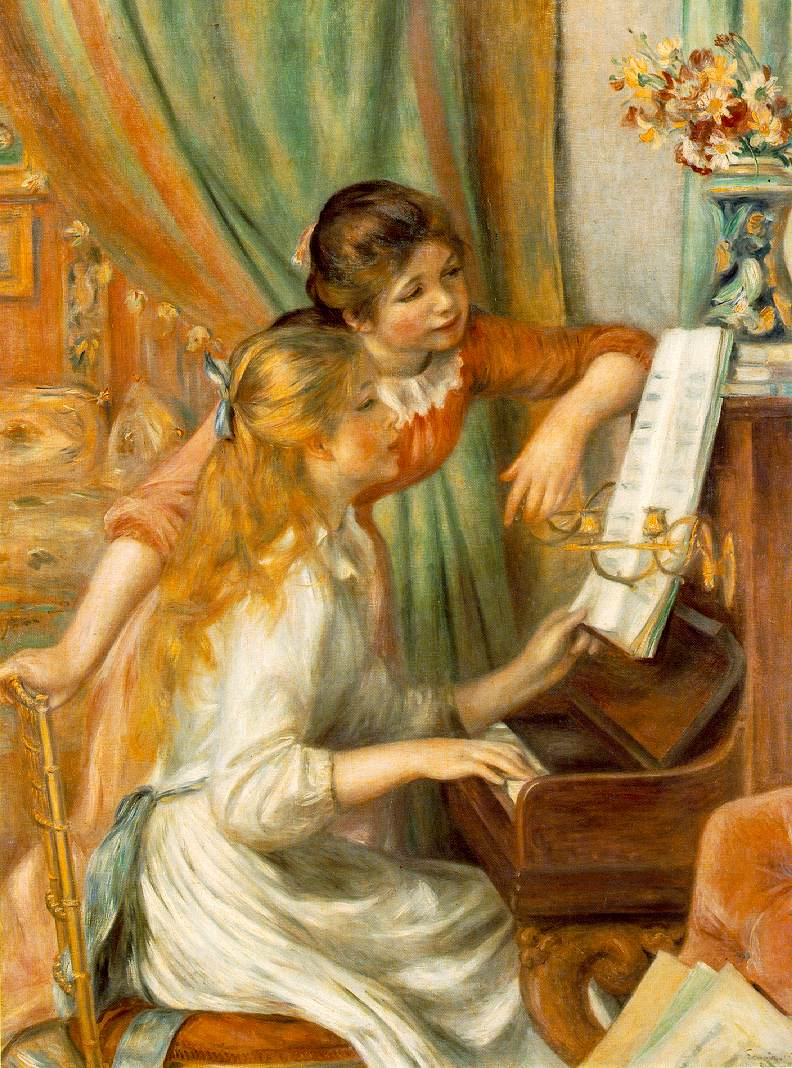
"Jeunes filles au piano" ("Girls at the Piano" by Pierre-Auguste Renoir, painted in 1892. Musée d’Orsay, Paris.

The social history of the piano is the history of the instrument's role in society. The piano was invented at the end of the 17th century, had become widespread in Western society by the end of the 18th, and is still widely played today.

== Early years ==
At the time of its origin around the year 1700, the piano was a speculative invention, produced by the well-paid craftsman and inventor Bartolomeo Cristofori for his wealthy patron Ferdinando de Medici, Grand Prince of Florence. As such, it was an extremely expensive item. For some time after its invention, the piano was largely owned by royalty (e.g. the kings of Portugal and Prussia); see Fortepiano for details. Even later on, (i.e. throughout the 18th and early 19th centuries), pianos were financially beyond the reach of most families, and the pianos of those times were generally the property of the gentry and the aristocracy. Visiting music masters taught their children to play the piano. Gravicembalo col piano e forte was the original name for the piano, meaning "harpsichord with soft and loud" in Italian.

== Pianos and women ==
Both Parakilas and Loesser emphasize a connection during this period between pianos and the female gender; piano study was apparently more common for girls than boys. Despite this, women were discouraged from playing the piano professionally and were encouraged not to take their musical aspirations too seriously. Nevertheless, women were considered more attractive and desirable if they could play the piano. The piano was a symbol of social status, and the ability to play the piano stood as a testament to a woman's marriageability.

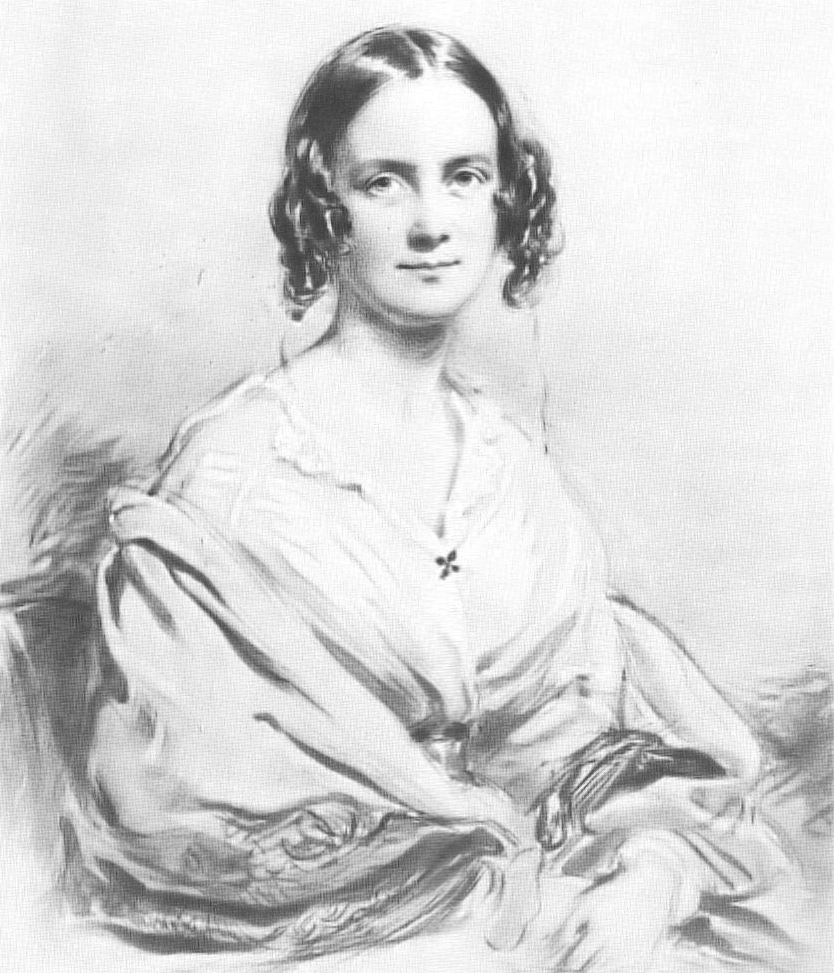
Emma Wedgwood Darwin

Women who had learned to play as children often continued to play as adults, thus providing music in their households. For instance, Emma Wedgwood (1808–1896), the granddaughter of the wealthy industrialist Josiah Wedgwood, took piano lessons from Frédéric Chopin and apparently achieved a fair level of proficiency. Following her marriage to Charles Darwin, Emma still played the piano daily, while her husband listened appreciatively.

A number of female piano students became outright virtuose, and the skills of women pianists inspired the work of Haydn, Mozart, and Beethoven, who dedicated difficult-to-play works to their female friends. However, careers as concert musicians were typically open only to men (an important exception was Clara Schumann).

== The spread of the piano in Europe ==
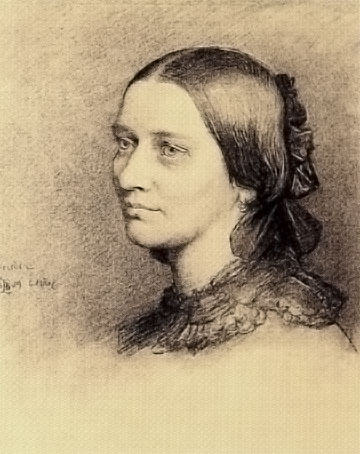
Clara Schumann was an outstanding pianist

When the piano was invented in 1700, it failed to catch the public's attention due to its expense and the fact that the harpsichord was the preferred instrument of the time. Very few people knew of the piano until after the Seven Years' War when a young man named Johannes Zumpe fled Germany for London. While there he refined Cristofori's piano, introducing separate sections of black keys as well as treble and bass capabilities. This new piano was extremely difficult to play, and very few people learned how to play the instrument because of this. That changed when Zumpe convinced Johann Christian Bach, the personal music master to Queen Charlotte and an international celebrity, to purchase and play on a Zumpe piano for the first ever Zumpe piano concert in 1768. Because of Bach's fame, the piano soon replaced the harpsichord as the predominant instrument of the time, and later composers such as Mozart and Beethoven chose to play on a Zumpe piano.

Bach's fame and the interest of Queen Charlotte helped the piano become a symbol of social status. The turn of the 19th century also saw the rise of the middle class in the Western world. This middle class was eager to showcase their social status, and it became the proper Victorian man's goal to shower his wife and daughters with leisure time and leisure activities, as leisure was a symbol of social status. Consequently, the piano, which was often used for leisure, stood as a testament to a family's position on the socioeconomic ladder.

Over the course of the 19th and 20th centuries, the middle class of Europe and North America increased in both numbers and prosperity. This increase produced a corresponding rise in the domestic importance of the piano, as ever more families became able to afford pianos and piano instruction. The piano also became common in public institutions, such as schools, hotels, and public houses. As elements of the Western middle-class lifestyle gradually spread to other nations, the piano became common in these nations as well, for example in Japan.

To understand the rise of the piano among the middle class, it is helpful to remember that before mechanical and electronic reproduction, music was in fact performed on a daily basis by ordinary people. For instance, the working people of every nation generated a body of folk music, which was transmitted orally down through the generations and sung by all. The parents of Joseph Haydn (1732–1809) could not read music, yet Haydn's father (who worked as a wheelwright) taught himself to play the harp, and the Haydn family frequently played and sang together. With rising prosperity, the many families that could now afford pianos and music adapted their home-grown musical abilities to the new instrument, and the piano became a major source of music in the home.

Amateur pianists in the home often kept track of the doings of the leading pianists and composers of their day. Professional virtuosi wrote books and methods for the study of piano playing, which sold widely. The virtuosi also prepared their own editions of classical works, which included detailed marks of tempo and expression to guide the amateur who wanted to use their playing as a model. (Today, students are usually encouraged to work from an Urtext edition.) The piano compositions of the great composers often sold well among amateurs, despite the fact that, starting with Beethoven, they were often far too hard for anyone but a trained virtuoso to play well. Evidently, the amateur pianists obtained satisfaction from coming to grips with the finest music, even if they could not perform it from start to finish.

A favourite form of musical recreation in the home was playing works for four-hand piano, in which the two players sit side by side at a single piano. These were frequently arrangements of orchestral works, and in the days before recordings served to spread knowledge of new orchestral music to places lacking an orchestra. Sometimes members of the household would sing or play other instruments along with the piano. This practice was often a part of courtship, for performing music together—particularly in the presence or at least earshot of other members of the household—was one of the few "respectable" ways for a young man and young woman from "good" families to be together.

Parents whose children showed unusual talent often pushed them toward professional careers, sometimes making great sacrifices to make this possible. Artur Schnabel's book My Life and Music vividly depicts his own experience along these lines, which took place in the Austro-Hungarian Empire in the late 19th century.

== The spread of the piano in East Asia ==
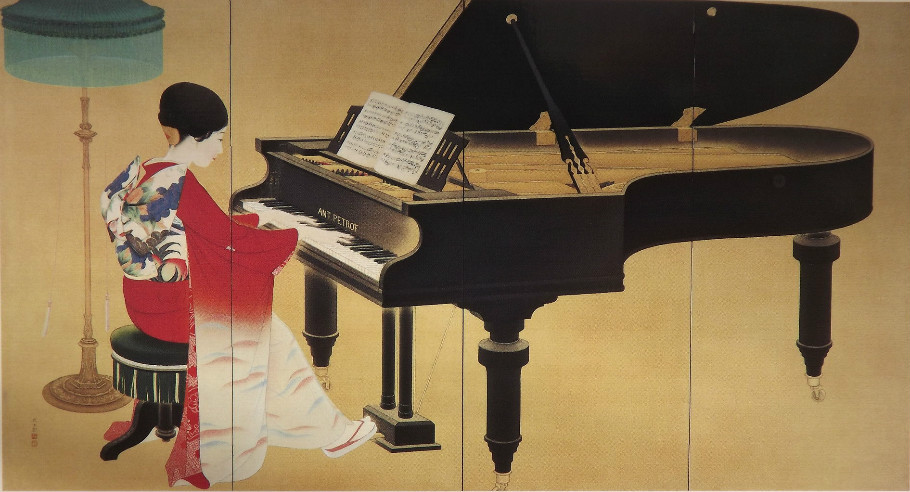
The Piano, by Nakamura Daizaburō, painted in 1926, demonstrating piano playing in Taishō-era Japan.

Pianos were adopted in Japan in the late 19th century, after the Meiji Restoration as part of modernization reforms. To the reformers who were threatened with European domination, the piano functioned as a symbol of international modernity, granting access to a world where western technical expertise and cultural knowledge were valued. This was part of a process of avoiding European colonialism by accepting western cultural practices and institutions, which was quickly internalized by the Meiji government and the people. American missionaries of the German Reformed Church arrived in Japan in 1879, and in the 1880s set up music departments that offered college-level training in western music, including the piano.

In the 1920s, the piano replaced the koto as the preferred instrument for Japanese women to cultivate before marriage. The Taishō-era arist Nakamura Daizaburō painted The Piano in 1926, which depicts his fiancée dressed in a kimono and performing Robert Schumann's Träumerei on a Russian piano. Playing the piano was adopted in Japan as part of domestic modernity, as opposed to the traditional and pre-modern conception of musicians as social outcasts. The piano became a source of education, spiritual and moral discipline, and cultural capital useful in the marriage market.

== Decline ==
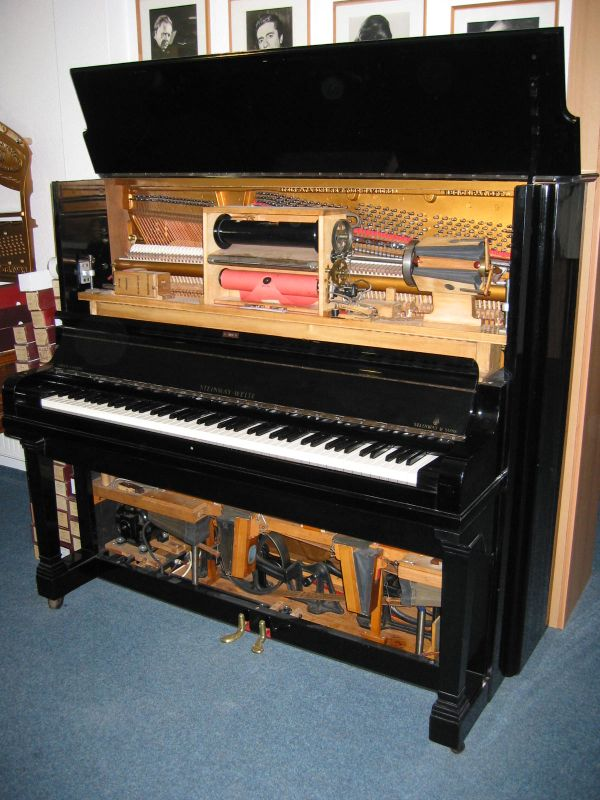
Steinway Welte-Mignon reproducing piano (1919)

The piano's status in the home remained secure until technology made possible the enjoyment of music in passive form. First the player piano (c. 1900), then the home phonograph (which became common in the decade before World War I), then the radio (in the 1920s) dealt severe blows to amateur piano-playing as a form of domestic recreation. During the Great Depression of the 1930s, piano sales dropped sharply, and many manufacturers went out of business.

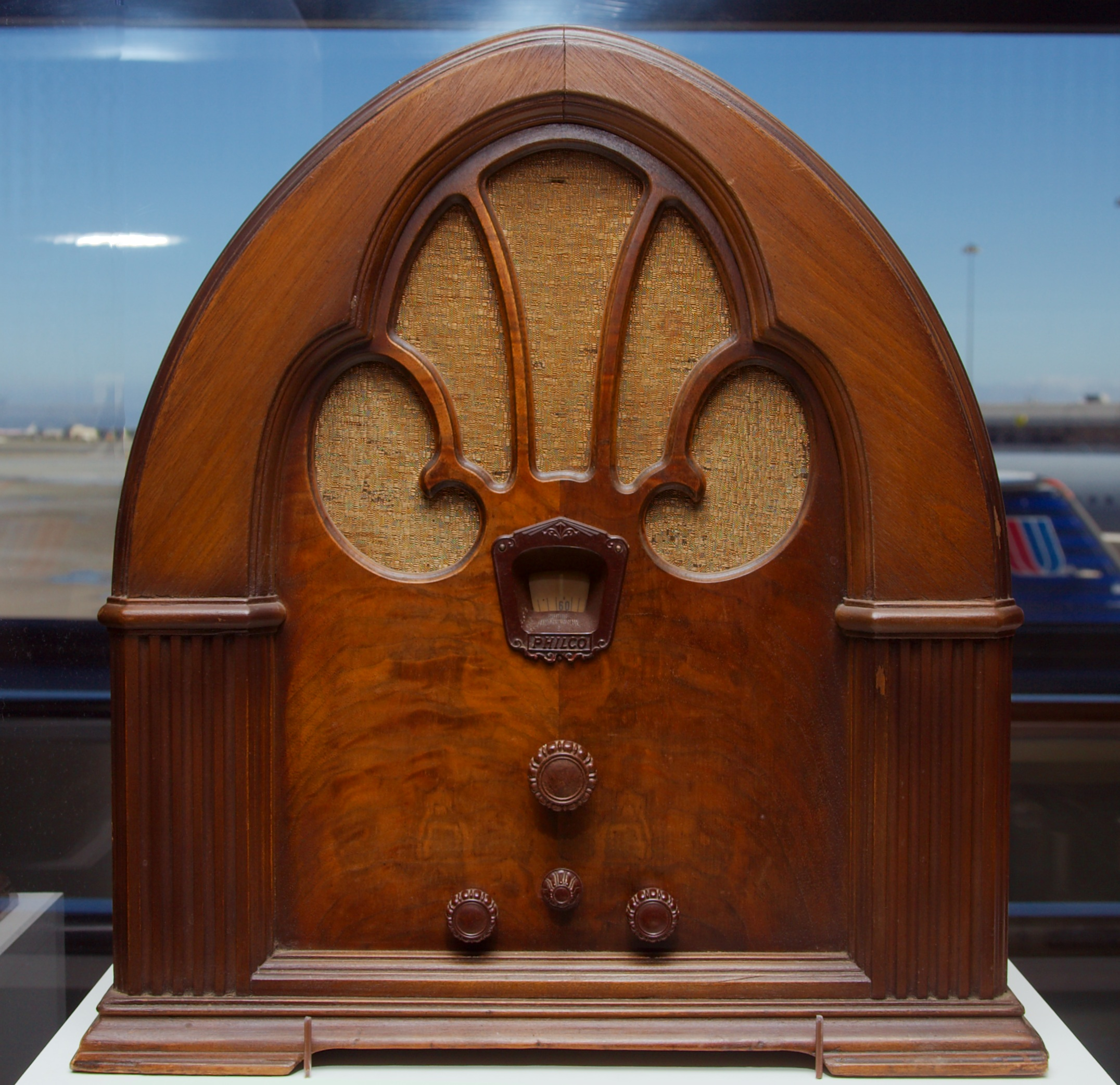
Philco 90 "cathedral" style radio, 1931

Nevertheless, the piano survives to this day in many 21st-century homes. The pianos being bought today tend to be of higher quality and more expensive than those of several decades ago, suggesting perhaps that domestic piano playing may have concentrated itself in homes of wealthier or better-educated members of the middle class.

== See also ==
- Golden Age of the Piano, the period at which the piano enjoyed its greatest popularity as a hobby
