= Leonard Darwin =

Son of Charles Darwin (1850–1943)

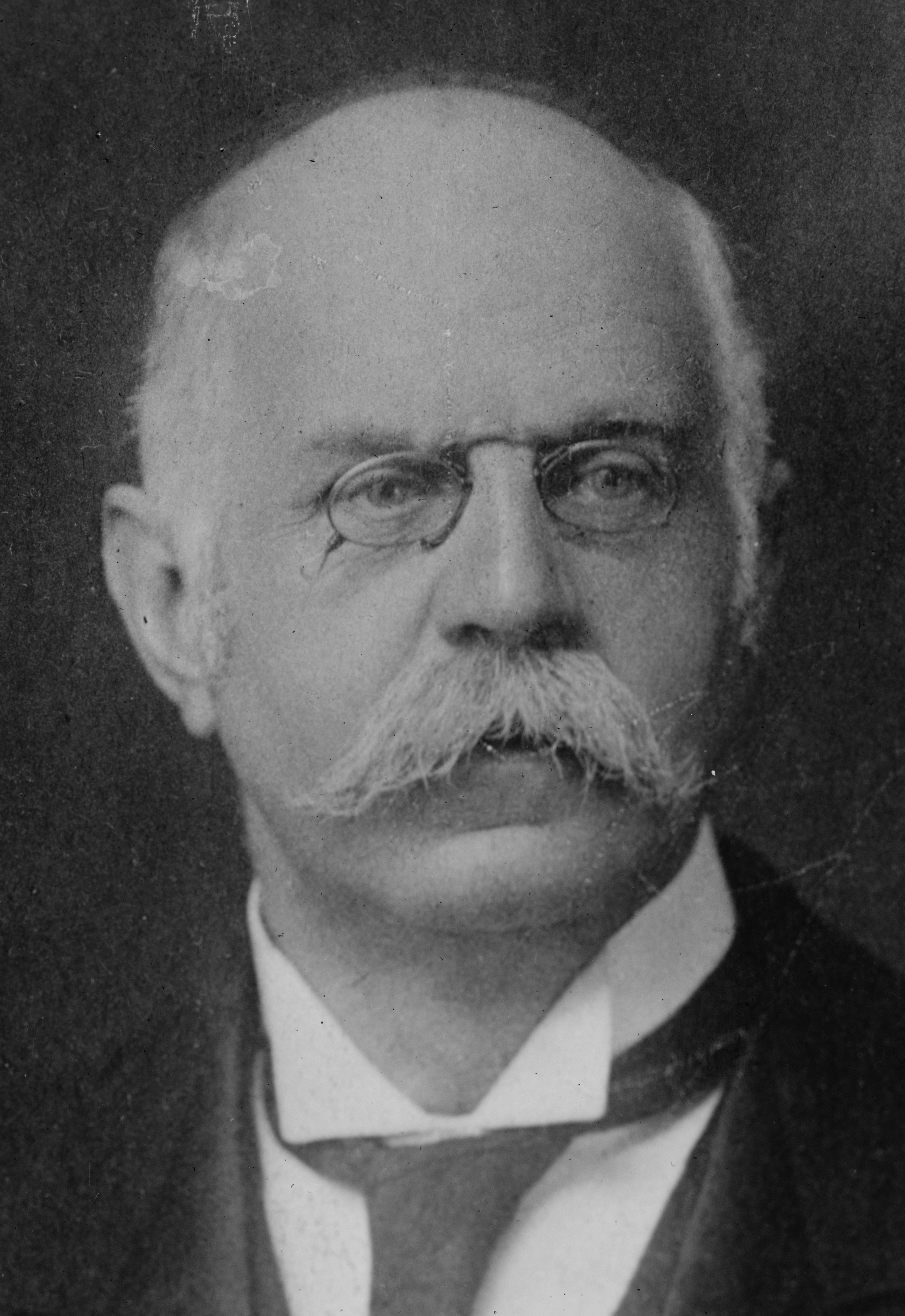
- Leonard Darwin in April 1916
- Born: 15 January 1850; Down House, Kent, England
- Died: 26 March 1943 (aged 93); Forest Row, England
- Parent(s): Charles Darwin; Emma Wedgwood
- Relatives: Darwin–Wedgwood family

Leonard Darwin FRGS (15 January 1850 – 26 March 1943) was an English politician, economist and eugenicist. He was a son of the naturalist Charles Darwin, and also a mentor to Ronald Fisher, a statistician and evolutionary biologist.

== Biography ==
Leonard Darwin was born in 1850 at Down House, Kent, into the wealthy Darwin–Wedgwood family. He was the fourth son and eighth child of the naturalist Charles Darwin and his wife Emma Wedgwood, and the last of Darwin's immediate offspring to die. He considered himself the least intelligent of their children – brothers Frank, George and Horace were all elected Fellows of the Royal Society. He was sent to Clapham School in 1862.

Darwin joined the Royal Engineers in 1871. Between 1877 and 1882 he worked for the Intelligence Division of the Ministry of War. He went on several scientific expeditions, including those to observe the Transit of Venus in 1874 and 1882.

In 1889, Darwin was promoted to the rank of major, but soon left the army and from 1892 to 1895 was a Liberal Unionist Member of Parliament (MP) for Lichfield constituency in Staffordshire, where his grandfather, Josiah Wedgwood II, had also been an MP. He wrote vigorously on the economic issues of the day: bimetallism, Indian currency reform and municipal trade.

Darwin married Elizabeth Frances Fraser on 11 July 1882. She died 16 years later, on 13 January 1898. On 29 November 1900, he married his second cousin, Charlotte Mildred Massingberd, granddaughter of Charlotte Wedgwood, his mother's sister. Their shared ancestor was Josiah Wedgwood II. His wife Charlotte's paternal grandfather married his paternal aunt, after her grandmother Charlotte's death. Since Leonard's parents were cousins, Charlotte was also a second cousin on his father's side. Leonard had no children from either marriage.

In April 1900, Darwin was back working for the army, when he was appointed a deputy assistant adjutant general for military intelligence.

He was president of the Royal Geographical Society from 1908 to 1911 and chairman of the British Eugenics Society from 1911 to 1928 – succeeding his half-cousin once removed Francis Galton. He became the society's honorary president in 1928. In 1912 the University of Cambridge conferred on him an honorary doctorate of science.

Darwin played an important part in the life of the geneticist and statistician Ronald Fisher, supporting him intellectually, morally and sometimes financially. Fisher, replying to Darwin's congratulations on his election to the Royal Society, replied on 25 February 1929, "I knew you would be glad, and your pleasure is as good to me almost as though my own father were still living."

Some years before, Fisher had resigned from the Royal Statistical Society after a disagreement. Darwin regretted this and engineered Fisher's re-entry by making him a gift of a life-time subscription. Fisher's 1930 book The Genetical Theory of Natural Selection is dedicated to Darwin. After Darwin's death in 1943 at the age of 93, Fisher wrote to Darwin's niece, Margaret Keynes, "My very dear friend Leonard Darwin... was surely the kindest and wisest man I ever knew."

Darwin retired to Cripps Corner at Forest Row, East Sussex in 1921, with his second wife Charlotte Mildred Massingberd (died 1940), and lived there until his death in 1943. He and Charlotte were buried at Forest Row Cemetery. Leonard Darwin was the last surviving child of Charles Darwin.

== In popular culture ==
Darwin was portrayed by Derek Ensor in the 1985 Central Television serial The Last Place on Earth, in his capacity as President of the RGS at the beginning of the Terra Nova Expedition.

== Publications ==
- The Need for Eugenic Reform. London: Murray. 1926.
- What is Eugenics. London: Watts & Co. 1928.

== Bibliography ==
- W. F. Edwards: "Darwin, Leonard", Oxford Dictionary of National Biography (Oxford, UK:Oxford University Press), 2004. Pay-walled
- Leonard Darwin, Monthly Notices of the Royal Astronomical Society, 04/01/1944, Vol. 104 (2), pp. 89–90
- Serpente, Norberto (August 2016). "More than a Mentor: Leonard Darwin's Contribution to the Assimilation of Mendelism into Eugenics and Darwinism". Journal of the History of Biology. 49 (3): 461–494. doi:10.1007/s10739-015-9423-6. PMID 26391791.
- R. A. Fisher, J. H. Bennet and L. Darwin, Natural Selection, Heredity and Eugenics: Including Selected Correspondence of R. A. Fisher with Leonard Darwin and Others (Oxford, UK: Clarendon Press), 1983
- Leonard Darwin, The Need for Eugenic Reform (London, UK: John Murray), 1926
