= Anne Darwin =

Daughter of Charles Darwin (1841–1851)

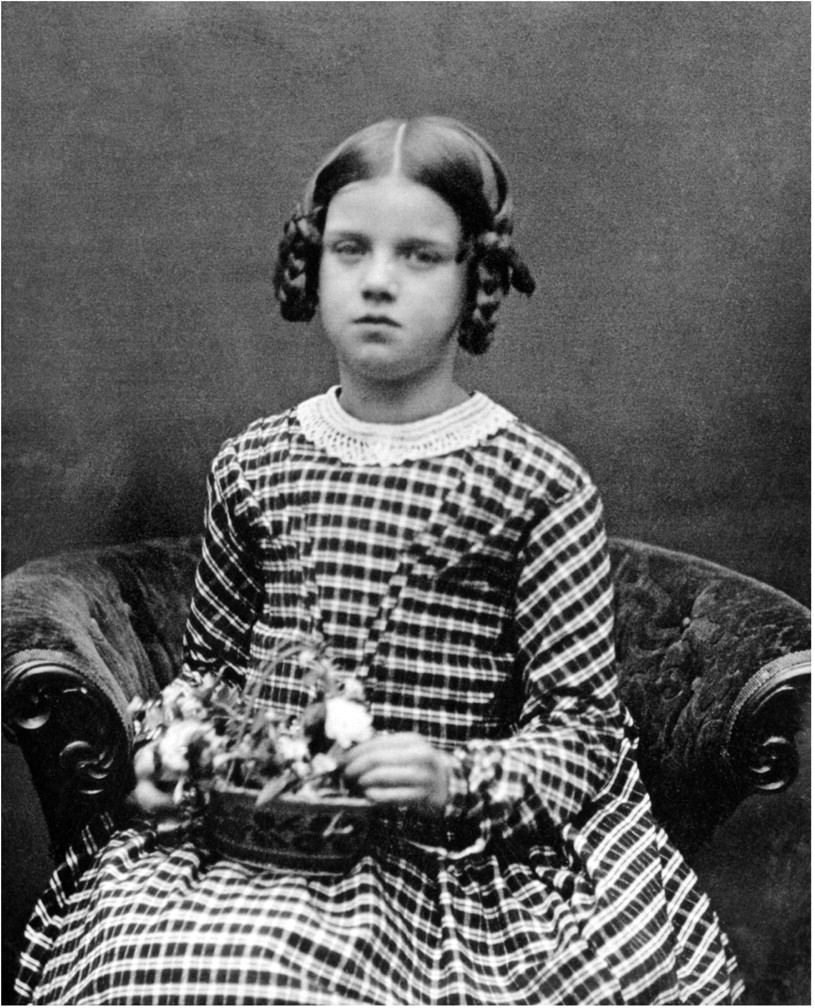
- Darwin in 1849
- Born: Anne Elizabeth Darwin; 2 March 1841
- Died: 23 April 1851 (aged 10); Great Malvern, Worcestershire, England
- Other name: Annie
- Parents: Charles Darwin (father); Emma Wedgwood (mother)
- Relatives: See Darwin–Wedgwood family

Anne Elizabeth Darwin (2 March 1841 – 23 April 1851) was the second child and eldest daughter of Charles and Emma Darwin.

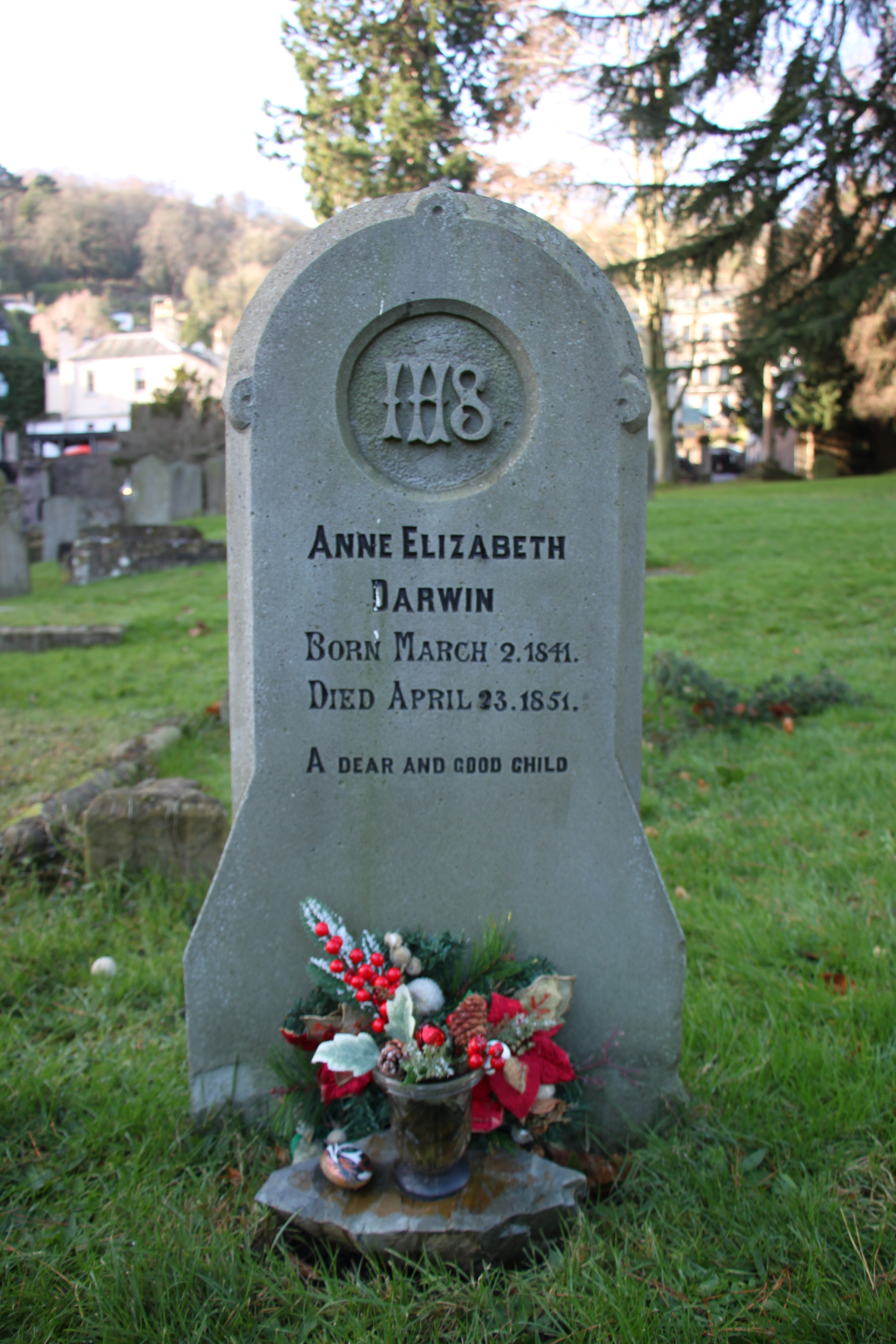
Anne's grave in Great Malvern

== Life ==
Darwin scholar E. Janet Browne writes:

Anne was ... the apple of her proud father's eye, his favourite child, he confessed to [his friend and cousin William Darwin Fox]. More than any of the other children she treated him with a spontaneous affection that touched him deeply; she liked to smooth his hair and pat his clothes into shape, and was by nature self-absorbedly neat and tidy, cutting out delicate bits of paper to put away in her workbox, threading ribbons, and sewing small things for her dolls and make-believe worlds.

In 1849, Anne caught scarlet fever along with her two sisters, and her health thereafter declined; some authorities believe that she suffered from tuberculosis. In vain pursuit of help from James Manby Gully's water cure, Charles Darwin took his daughter to the Worcestershire spa town, Great Malvern. She died in Montreal House on the Worcester Road, aged ten, and was buried in the Great Malvern Priory churchyard.

Anne's death was a terrible blow for her parents. Charles wrote in a personal memoir "We have lost the joy of the household, and the solace of our old age.... Oh that she could now know how deeply, how tenderly we do still & and shall ever love her dear joyous face."

The loss of Charles Darwin's beloved daughter was softened only by the addition of Horace Darwin, who was born only three weeks after Anne's death on 13 May 1851.

== Annie's Box ==
Around 2000, Charles Darwin's great-great-grandson Randal Keynes discovered a box containing keepsakes of Anne collected by Charles and Emma. He wrote a biography of Charles Darwin centred on the relationship between Darwin and his daughter, entitled Annie's Box; the script of the 2009 film Creation is based on the book.
