= Charles Darwin =

English naturalist and biologist (1809–1882)

Charles Darwin JP FRS FRGS FLS FZS
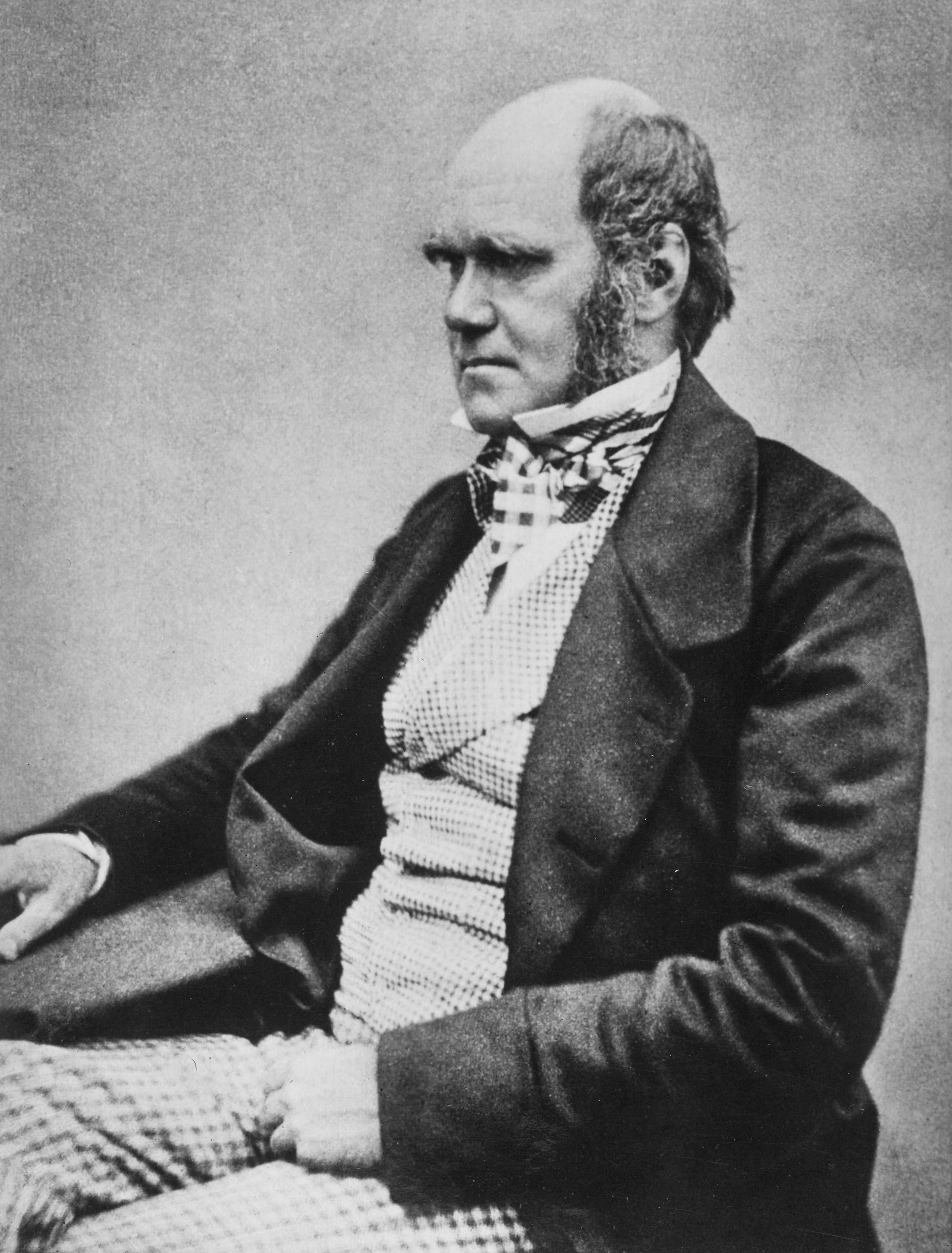
- Darwin, c. 1854
- Born: Charles Robert Darwin; 12 February 1809; Shrewsbury, Shropshire, England
- Died: 19 April 1882 (aged 73); Downe, Kent, England
- Resting place: Westminster Abbey
- Education: University of Edinburgh; Christ's College, Cambridge (BA, MA)
- Known for: Natural selection
- Spouse: Emma Wedgwood (m. 1839)
- Children: 10, including William, Henrietta, George, Francis, Leonard and Horace
- Parents: Robert Darwin; Susannah Wedgwood
- Family: Darwin–Wedgwood
- Awards: FRS (1839); Royal Medal (1853); Wollaston Medal (1859); Copley Medal (1864); Pour le Mérite (1867); Baly Medal (1879)
- Writing career
- Notable works: The Voyage of the Beagle; On the Origin of Species; The Descent of Man; Expression of the Emotions
- Scientific career
- Fields: Natural history; Geology
- Workplaces: Geological Society of London
- Academic advisors: Robert Edmond Grant; John Stevens Henslow; Adam Sedgwick
- Author abbrev. (botany): Darwin
- Author abbrev. (zoology): Darwin

Charles Robert Darwin (/ˈdɑːrwɪn/ DAR-win; 12 February 1809 – 19 April 1882) was an English naturalist, geologist, and biologist, widely known for his contributions to evolutionary biology. His proposition that all species have descended from a common ancestor is now accepted and considered a fundamental scientific concept. In a joint presentation with Alfred Russel Wallace, he proposed that this branching pattern of evolution resulted from a process he called natural selection, in which the struggle for existence has a similar effect to the artificial selection involved in selective breeding. Darwin has been described as one of the most influential figures in human history and was honoured by burial in Westminster Abbey.

Darwin's early interest in nature led him to neglect his medical education at the University of Edinburgh; instead, he helped Robert Edmond Grant to investigate marine invertebrates. His studies at the University of Cambridge's Christ's College from 1828 to 1831 encouraged his passion for natural science. However, it was his five-year voyage on HMS Beagle from 1831 to 1836 that established Darwin as an eminent geologist. The observations he made during his voyage supported Charles Lyell's concept of gradual geological change. The Voyage of the Beagle (1839), Darwin's travel journal, made him a popular author. His first scientific work was The Structure and Distribution of Coral Reefs (1842). Along with his work on barnacles, it won him the Royal Medal in 1853.

Puzzled by the geographical distribution of wildlife and fossils he collected on the voyage, Darwin began detailed investigations and, in 1838, devised his theory of natural selection. Although he discussed his ideas with several naturalists, he needed time for extensive research, and his geological work had priority. He was writing up his theory in 1858 when Wallace sent him an essay outlining the same idea, prompting the joint submission of "On the Tendency of Species to form Varieties; and on the Perpetuation of Varieties and Species by Natural Means of Selection" to the Linnean Society of London. Darwin's work established descent with modification as the scientific explanation of natural diversity. Darwin published his theory of evolution with compelling evidence in On the Origin of Species (1859). He explored coevolution in Fertilisation of Orchids (1862) and human evolution and sexual selection in The Descent of Man, and Selection in Relation to Sex (1871). The Expression of the Emotions in Man and Animals (1872) was an early work of psychology, and one of the first books to feature photographs. His final book was The Formation of Vegetable Mould, through the Actions of Worms (1881).

By the 1870s, the scientific community and a majority of the educated public had accepted evolution as a fact. However, many initially favoured competing explanations that gave only a minor role to natural selection. It was not until the emergence of the modern evolutionary synthesis from the 1930s to the 1950s that a broad consensus developed in which natural selection was the basic mechanism of evolution. Darwin's discovery is the unifying theory of the life sciences, explaining the unity and diversity of life.

== Biography ==
=== Early life and education ===
Charles Robert Darwin was born on 12 February 1809 at his family's home, The Mount, in Shrewsbury, Shropshire. He was the fifth of six children of wealthy society doctor and financier Robert Darwin and Susannah Darwin (née Wedgwood). His grandfathers Erasmus Darwin and Josiah Wedgwood were both prominent abolitionists. Erasmus Darwin had praised general concepts of evolution and common descent in his Zoonomia (1794), a poetic fantasy of gradual creation including undeveloped ideas anticipating concepts his grandson developed.

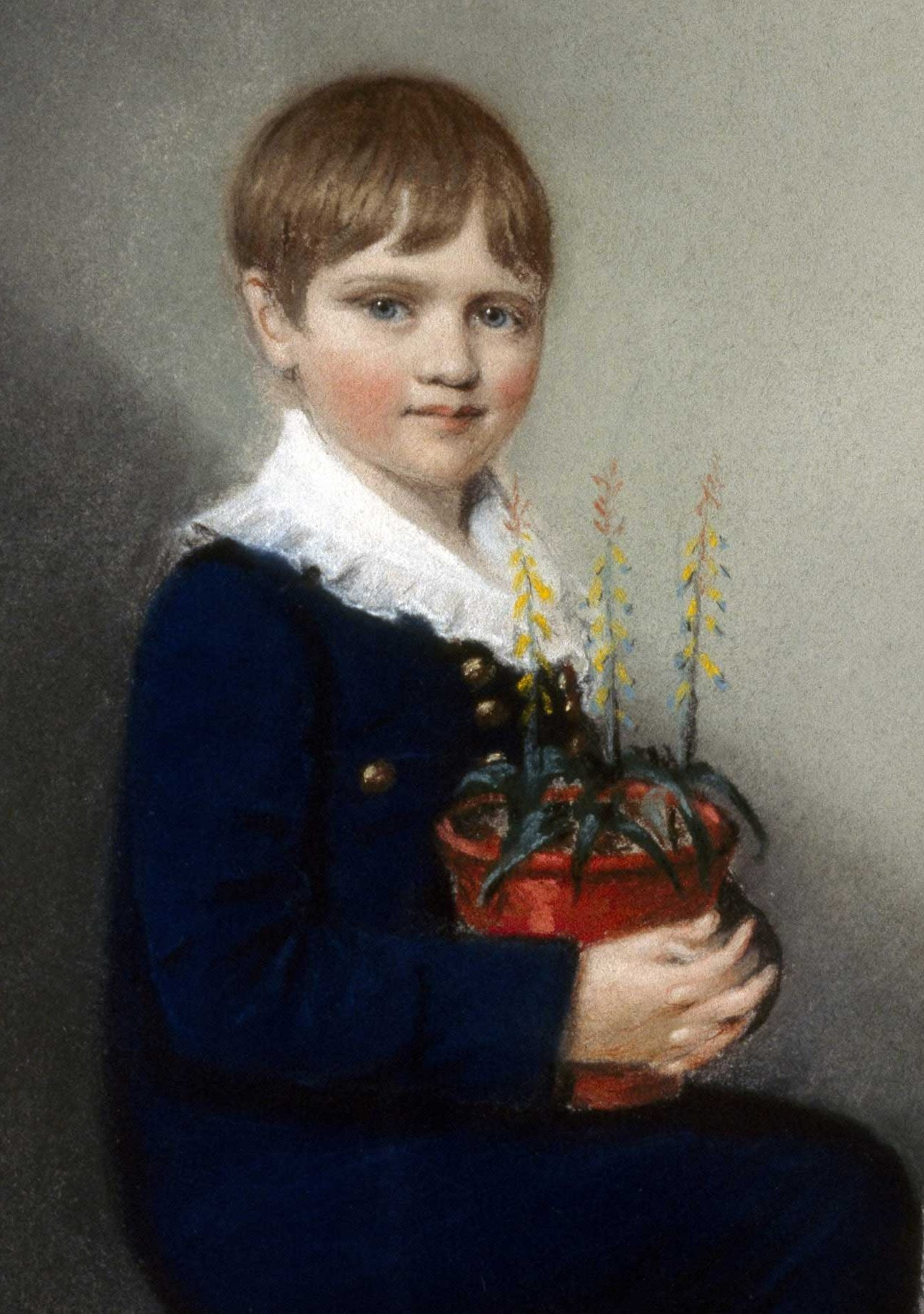
A chalk drawing of the seven-year-old Darwin in 1816, with a potted plant, by Ellen Sharples. Part of a double portrait showing him together with his sister Catherine.

Both families were largely Unitarian, though the Wedgwoods were adopting Anglicanism. Robert Darwin, a freethinker, had baby Charles baptised in November 1809 in the Anglican St Chad's Church, Shrewsbury, but Charles and his siblings attended the local Unitarian Church with their mother. The eight-year-old Charles already had a taste for natural history and collecting when he joined the day school run by its preacher in 1817. That July, his mother died. From September 1818, he joined his older brother Erasmus in attending the nearby Anglican Shrewsbury School as a boarder.

Darwin spent the summer of 1825 as an apprentice doctor, helping his father treat impoverished people in Shropshire, before going to the well-regarded University of Edinburgh Medical School with his brother Erasmus in October 1825. Darwin found lectures dull and surgery distressing, so he neglected his studies. He learned taxidermy in around 40 daily hour-long sessions from John Edmonstone, a Black Briton from Demerara in the South American rainforest, who had been taught there by Charles Waterton, and when brought to Scotland was freed from slavery.

In Darwin's second year at the university, he joined the Plinian Society, a student natural-history group featuring lively debates in which radical democratic students with materialistic views challenged orthodox religious concepts of science. He assisted Robert Edmond Grant's investigations of the anatomy and life cycle of marine invertebrates in the Firth of Forth, and on 27 March 1827 presented at the Plinian his own discovery that black spores found in oyster shells were the eggs of a skate leech.

One day, Grant praised Lamarck's evolutionary ideas. Darwin was astonished by Grant's audacity, but had recently read similar ideas in his grandfather Erasmus' journals. Darwin was rather bored by Robert Jameson's natural-history course, which covered geology – including the debate between neptunism and plutonism. He learned the classification of plants. He assisted with work on the collections of the University Museum, one of the largest museums in Europe at the time.

Darwin's neglect of medical studies annoyed his father, who sent him to Christ's College, Cambridge in January 1828 to study for a Bachelor of Arts degree as the first step towards becoming an Anglican country parson. Darwin was unqualified for Cambridge's Tripos exams and was required instead to join the ordinary degree course. He preferred riding and shooting to studying. At Cambridge, Darwin joined a society known as the "Glutton Club," which consumed "birds and beasts which were before unknown to human palate." Darwin would continue to eat the meat of exotic animals for the rest of his life; on the voyage of the Beagle, he ate puma, iguanas, giant tortoises, armadillos, and mistakenly ate a rhea which he intended to study.

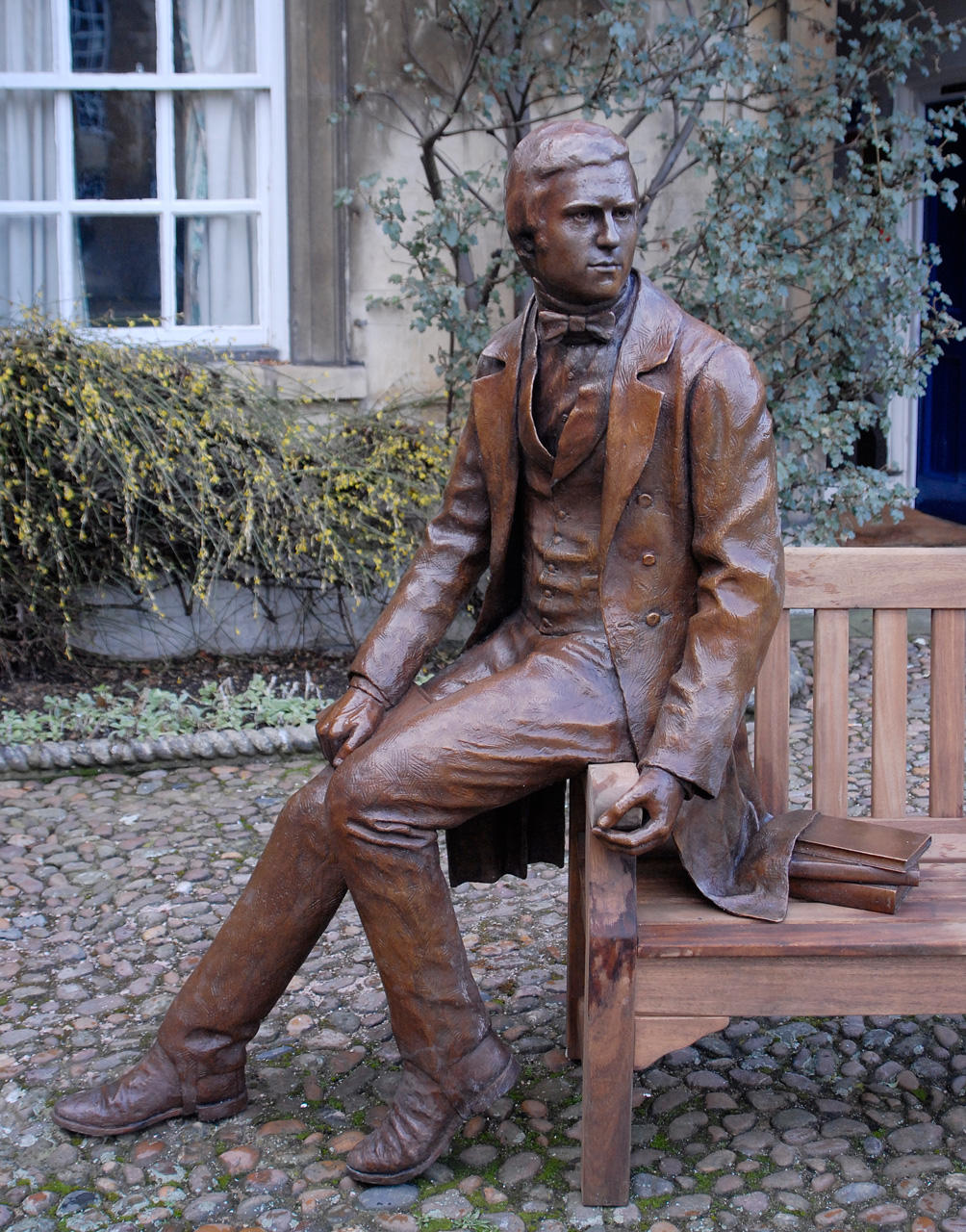
A bicentennial portrait by Anthony Smith of Darwin as a student, in the courtyard at Christ's College, Cambridge, where he had rooms.

During the first few months of Darwin's enrolment at Christ's College, his second cousin William Darwin Fox was still studying there. Fox impressed him with his butterfly collection, introducing Darwin to entomology and influencing him to pursue beetle collecting. He did this zealously and had some of his finds published in James Francis Stephens' Illustrations of British entomology (1829–1932).

Through Fox, Darwin became a close friend and follower of botany professor John Stevens Henslow. He met other leading parson-naturalists who saw scientific work as religious natural theology, becoming known to these dons as "the man who walks with Henslow". When his own exams drew near, Darwin applied himself to his studies and was delighted by the language and logic of William Paley's Evidences of Christianity (1795). In his final examination in January 1831, Darwin did well, coming tenth out of 178 candidates for the ordinary degree.

Darwin had to stay at Cambridge until June 1831. He studied Paley's Natural Theology or Evidences of the Existence and Attributes of the Deity (first published in 1802), which made an argument for divine design in nature, explaining adaptation as God acting through laws of nature. He read John Herschel's new book, Preliminary Discourse on the Study of Natural Philosophy (1831), which described the highest aim of natural philosophy as understanding such laws through inductive reasoning based on observation, and Alexander von Humboldt's Personal Narrative of scientific travels in 1799–1804. Inspired with "a burning zeal" to contribute, Darwin planned to visit Tenerife with some classmates after graduation to study natural history in the tropics. In preparation, he joined Adam Sedgwick's geology course, then on 4 August travelled with him to spend a fortnight mapping strata in Wales.

=== Survey voyage on HMS Beagle ===
The round-the-world voyage of the Beagle, 1831–1836

After leaving Sedgwick in Wales, Darwin spent a few days with student friends at Barmouth. He returned home on 29 August to find a letter from Henslow proposing him as a suitable (if unfinished) naturalist for a self-funded supernumerary place on HMS Beagle with captain Robert FitzRoy, a position for a gentleman rather than "a mere collector". The ship was to leave in four weeks on an expedition to chart the coastline of South America. Robert Darwin objected to his son's planned two-year voyage, regarding it as a waste of time, but was persuaded by his brother-in-law, Josiah Wedgwood II, to agree to (and fund) his son's participation. Darwin took care to remain in a private capacity to retain control over his collection, intending it for a major scientific institution.

After delays, the voyage began on 27 December 1831; it lasted almost five years. As FitzRoy had intended, Darwin spent most of that time on land investigating geology and making natural history collections, while HMS Beagle surveyed and charted coasts. He kept careful notes of his observations and theoretical speculations. At intervals during the voyage, his specimens were sent to Cambridge together with letters including a copy of his journal for his family. He had some expertise in geology, beetle collecting and dissecting marine invertebrates, but in all other areas was a novice; however, he ably collected specimens for expert appraisal. Despite suffering badly from seasickness, Darwin wrote copious notes while on board the ship. Most of his zoology notes are about marine invertebrates, starting with plankton collected during a calm spell. For his descriptions Darwin made use of the manual Werner's Nomenclature of Colours (1821) by Patrick Syme, which contained over one hundred standard colour terms for use by naturalists.

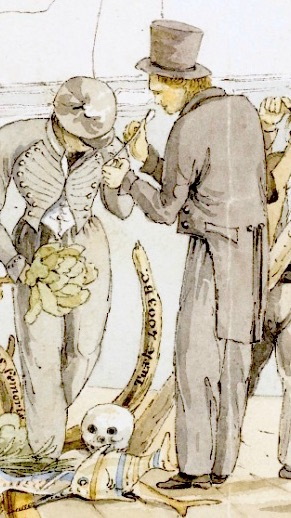
Darwin (right) on the Beagle's deck at Bahía Blanca in Argentina, with fossils; caricature by Augustus Earle, the initial ship's artist

On their first stop ashore at St Jago in Cape Verde, Darwin found that a white band high in the volcanic rock cliffs included seashells. FitzRoy had given him the first volume of Charles Lyell's Principles of Geology, which set out uniformitarian concepts of land slowly rising or falling over immense periods,^{[II]} and Darwin saw things Lyell's way, theorising and thinking of writing a book on geology. When they reached Brazil, Darwin was delighted by the tropical forest, but detested the sight of slavery there, and disputed this issue with FitzRoy.

The survey continued to the south in Patagonia. They stopped at Bahía Blanca, and in cliffs near Punta Alta, Darwin made a significant find of fossil bones of huge extinct mammals beside modern seashells, indicating recent extinction with no signs of change in climate or catastrophe. He found bony plates like a giant version of the armour on local armadillos. From a jaw and tooth, he identified the gigantic Megatherium, then from Cuvier's description thought the armour was from this animal. The finds were shipped to England, and scientists found the fossils of great interest.

On rides with gauchos into the interior to explore geology and collect more fossils, Darwin gained social, political, and anthropological insights into both native and colonial people at a time of revolution, and learnt that two types of rhea had separate but overlapping territories. Further south, he saw stepped plains of shingle and seashells as raised beaches at a series of elevations. He read Lyell's second volume and accepted its description of "centres of creation" of species, but his discoveries and theorising challenged Lyell's ideas of smooth continuity and of extinction of species. In Tierra del Fuego, Darwin formed the incorrect belief that the archipelago was devoid of reptiles.

Three Fuegians on board, who had been seized during the first Beagle voyage and then given Christian education in England, were returning with a missionary. Darwin found them friendly and civilised, yet at Tierra del Fuego he met "miserable, degraded savages", whom he viewed as differing as much from himself as wild from domesticated animals. He remained convinced that, despite this diversity, all humans were interrelated with a shared origin and potential for improvement towards civilisation. Unlike his scientist friends, he now thought there was no unbridgeable gap between humans and animals. A year on, the mission had been abandoned. The Fuegian they had named Jemmy Button lived like the other natives, had a wife, and had no wish to return to England.

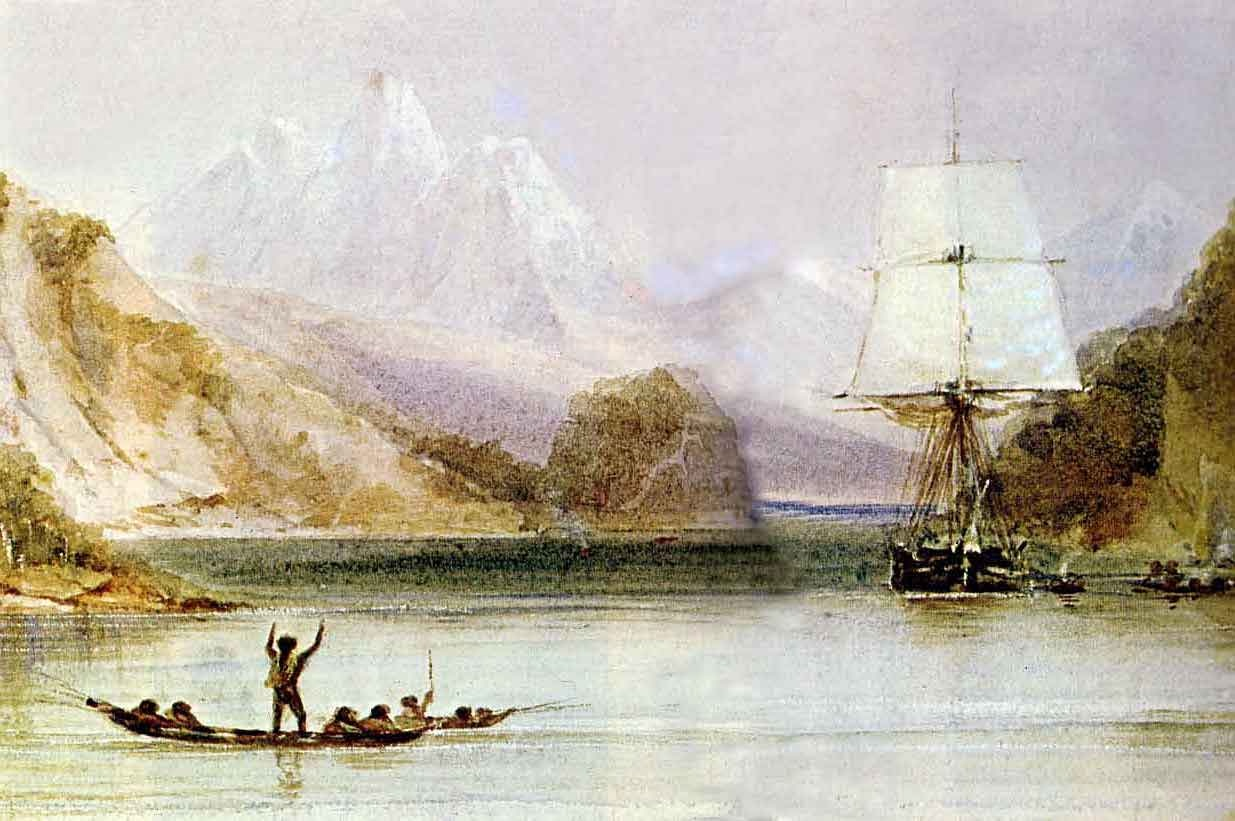
As HMS Beagle surveyed the coasts of South America, Darwin theorised about geology and the extinction of giant mammals. Watercolour by the ship's artist Conrad Martens, who replaced Augustus Earle, in Tierra del Fuego.

Darwin experienced an earthquake in Chile in 1835 and saw signs that the land had just been raised, including mussel beds stranded above high tide. High in the Andes, he saw seashells and several fossil trees that had grown on a sand beach. He theorised that as the land rose, oceanic islands sank, and coral reefs around them grew to form atolls.

On the geologically new Galápagos Islands, Darwin looked for evidence attaching wildlife to an older "centre of creation". He found mockingbirds allied to those in Chile but differing from island to island. He heard that slight variations in the shape of tortoise shells showed which island they came from, but failed to collect them, even after eating tortoises taken on board as food. In Australia, the marsupial rat-kangaroo and the platypus seemed so unusual that Darwin thought it was almost as though two distinct Creators had been at work. He found the Aboriginal Australians "good-humoured & pleasant", their numbers depleted by European settlement.

FitzRoy investigated how the atolls of the Cocos (Keeling) Islands had formed. The survey supported Darwin's theorising. FitzRoy began writing the official Narrative of the Beagle voyages, and after reading Darwin's diary, he proposed incorporating it into the account. Darwin's Journal was eventually rewritten as a separate third volume, on geology and natural history.

In Cape Town, South Africa, Darwin and FitzRoy met John Herschel, who had recently written to Lyell praising his uniformitarianism as opening bold speculation on "that mystery of mysteries, the replacement of extinct species by others" as "a natural in contradistinction to a miraculous process". When organising his notes as the ship sailed home, Darwin wrote that, if his growing suspicions about the mockingbirds, the tortoises and the Falkland Islands fox were correct, "such facts undermine the stability of Species", then cautiously added "would" before "undermine". He later wrote that such facts "seemed to me to throw some light on the origin of species".

Without Darwin's knowledge, extracts from his letters to Henslow had been read to scientific societies, printed as a pamphlet for private distribution among members of the Cambridge Philosophical Society, and reported in magazines, including The Athenaeum. Darwin first heard of this at Cape Town, and at Ascension Island read of Sedgwick's prediction that Darwin "will have a great name among the Naturalists of Europe".

=== Inception of Darwin's evolutionary theory ===
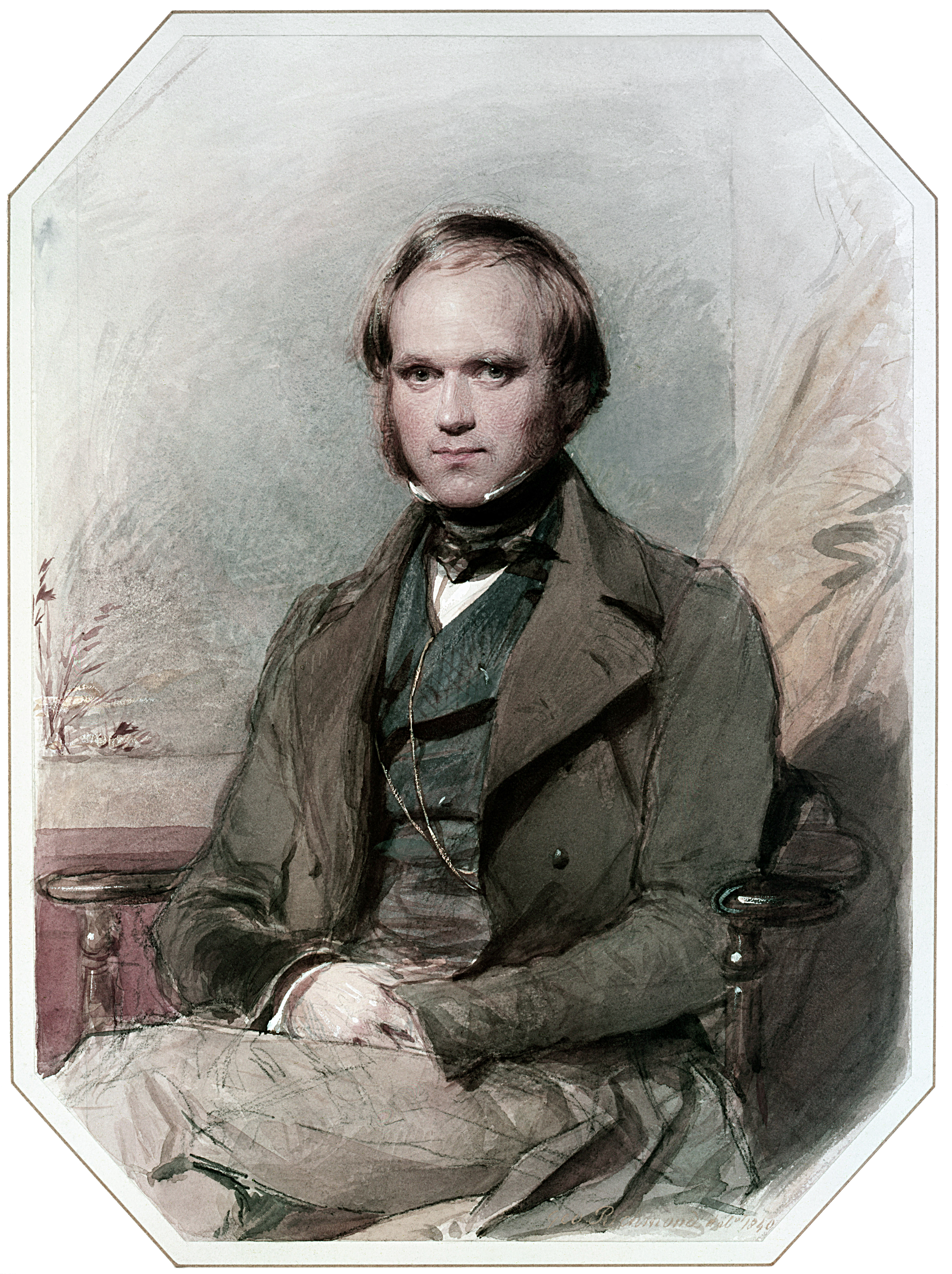
While still a young man, Darwin joined the scientific elite; portrait by George Richmond.

On 2 October 1836, Beagle anchored at Falmouth, Cornwall. Darwin promptly made the long coach journey to Shrewsbury to visit his home and see relatives. He then hurried to Cambridge to see Henslow, who advised him on finding available naturalists to catalogue Darwin's animal collections and to take on the botanical specimens. Darwin's father organised investments, enabling his son to be a self-funded gentleman scientist, and an excited Darwin went around the London institutions being fêted and seeking experts to describe the collections. British zoologists at the time had a huge backlog of work, due to the encouragement of natural history collecting throughout the British Empire, and there was a danger of specimens being left in storage.

Charles Lyell eagerly met Darwin for the first time on 29 October and soon introduced him to the up-and-coming anatomist Richard Owen, who had the facilities of the Royal College of Surgeons to work on the fossil bones collected by Darwin. Owen's surprising results included other gigantic extinct ground sloths as well as the Megatherium Darwin had identified, a near complete skeleton of the unknown Scelidotherium and a hippopotamus-sized rodent-like skull named Toxodon resembling a giant capybara. The armour fragments were actually from Glyptodon, a huge armadillo-like creature, as Darwin had initially thought. These extinct creatures were related to living species in South America.

In mid-December, Darwin took lodgings in Cambridge to arrange expert classification of his collections and prepare his own research for publication. Questions of how to combine his diary into the Narrative were resolved at the end of the month when FitzRoy accepted Broderip's advice to make it a separate volume, and Darwin began work on his Journal and Remarks.

Darwin's first paper showed that the South American landmass was slowly rising. With Lyell's enthusiastic backing, he read it to the Geological Society of London on 4 January 1837. On the same day, he presented his mammal and bird specimens to the Zoological Society. The ornithologist John Gould soon announced that the Galápagos birds that Darwin had thought a mixture of blackbirds, "gros-beaks" and finches, were, in fact, twelve separate species of finches. On 17 February, Darwin was elected to the Council of the Geological Society, and Lyell's presidential address presented Owen's findings on Darwin's fossils, stressing the geographical continuity of species as supporting his uniformitarian ideas.

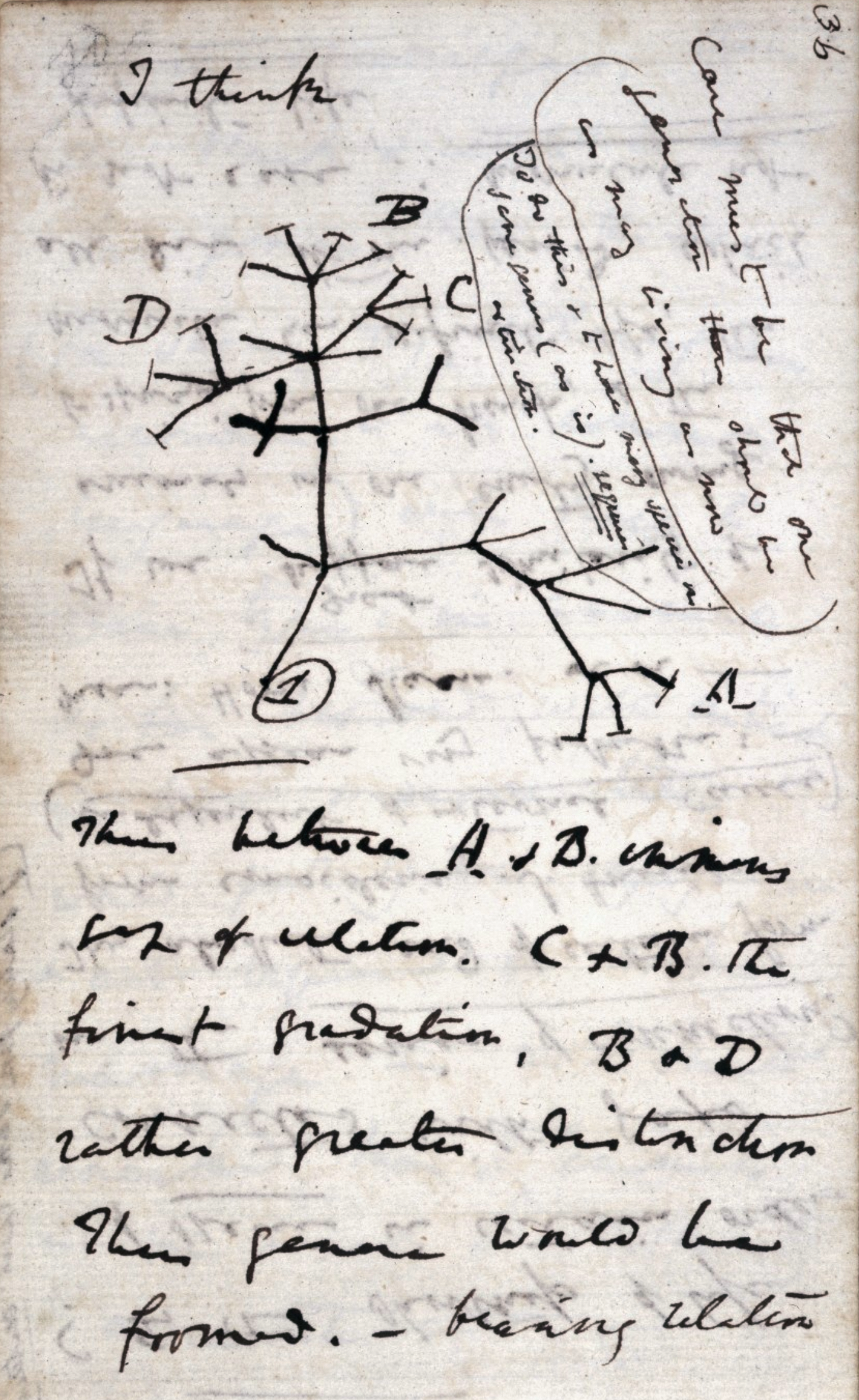
In mid-July 1837 Darwin started his "B" notebook on Transmutation of Species, and on page 36 wrote "I think" above his first evolutionary tree.

Early in March, Darwin moved to London to be near this work, joining Lyell's social circle of scientists and experts such as Charles Babbage, who described God as a programmer of laws. Darwin stayed with his freethinking brother Erasmus, part of this Whig circle and a close friend of the writer Harriet Martineau, who promoted the Malthusianism that underpinned the controversial Whig Poor Law reforms to stop welfare from causing overpopulation and more poverty. As a Unitarian, she welcomed the radical implications of transmutation of species, promoted by Grant and younger surgeons influenced by Geoffroy. Transmutation was anathema to Anglicans defending social order, but reputable scientists openly discussed the subject. There was broad interest in John Herschel's letter praising Lyell's approach as a way to find a natural cause of the origin of new species.

Gould met Darwin and told him that the Galápagos mockingbirds from different islands were separate species, not just varieties, and what Darwin had thought was a "wren" was in the finch group. Darwin had not labelled the finches by island, but from the notes of others on the ship, including FitzRoy, he allocated species to islands. The two rheas were distinct species, and on 14 March Darwin announced how their distribution changed going southwards.

By mid-March 1837, barely six months after his return to England, Darwin was speculating in his Red Notebook on the possibility that "one species does change into another" to explain the geographical distribution of living species such as the rheas, and extinct ones such as the strange extinct mammal Macrauchenia, which resembled a giant guanaco, a llama relative. Around mid-July, he recorded in his "B" notebook his thoughts on lifespan and variation across generations – explaining the variations he had observed in Galápagos tortoises, mockingbirds, and rheas. He sketched branching descent, and then a genealogical branching of a single evolutionary tree, in which "It is absurd to talk of one animal being higher than another", thereby discarding Lamarck's idea of independent lineages progressing to higher forms.

=== Overwork and illness ===
While developing this intensive study of transmutation, Darwin became mired in more work. Still rewriting his Journal, he took on editing and publishing the expert reports on his collections, and with Henslow's help obtained a Treasury grant of £1,000, equivalent to £97,000 in 2025, to sponsor this multi-volume Zoology of the Voyage of H.M.S. Beagle. He stretched the funding to include his planned books on geology, and agreed to unrealistic dates with the publisher. As the Victorian era began, Darwin pressed on with writing his Journal, and in August 1837 began correcting printer's proofs.

As Darwin worked under pressure, his health suffered. On 20 September, he had "an uncomfortable palpitation of the heart", so his doctors urged him to "knock off all work" and live in the country for a few weeks. After visiting Shrewsbury, he joined his Wedgwood relatives at Maer Hall, Staffordshire, but found them too eager for tales of his travels to give him much rest. His charming, intelligent, and cultured cousin Emma Wedgwood, nine months older than Darwin, was nursing his invalid aunt. His uncle Josiah pointed out an area of ground where cinders had disappeared under loam. Darwin suggested that this might have been the work of earthworms, inspiring "a new & important theory" on their role in soil formation, which he presented at the Geological Society on 1 November 1837. His Journal was printed and ready for publication by the end of February 1838, as was the first volume of the Narrative, but FitzRoy was still working hard to finish his own volume.

William Whewell pushed Darwin to take on the duties of Secretary of the Geological Society. After initially declining the work, he accepted the post in March 1838. Despite the grind of writing and editing the Beagle reports, Darwin made remarkable progress on transmutation, taking every opportunity to question expert naturalists and, unconventionally, people with practical experience in selective breeding such as farmers and pigeon fanciers. Over time, his research drew on information from his relatives and children, the family butler, neighbours, colonists, and former shipmates. He included mankind in his speculations from the outset, and on seeing an orangutan in the zoo on 28 March 1838 noted its childlike behaviour.

The strain took a toll, and by June, he was being laid up for days on end with stomach problems, headaches, and heart symptoms. For the rest of his life, he was repeatedly incapacitated with episodes of stomach pains, vomiting, severe boils, palpitations, trembling, and other symptoms, particularly during times of stress, such as attending meetings or making social visits. The cause of Darwin's illness remained unknown, and attempts at treatment had only ephemeral success.

On 23 June, he took a break and went "geologising" in Scotland. He visited Glen Roy in glorious weather to see the parallel "roads" cut into the hillsides at three heights. He later published his view that these were marine-raised beaches, but then had to accept that they were shorelines of a proglacial lake.

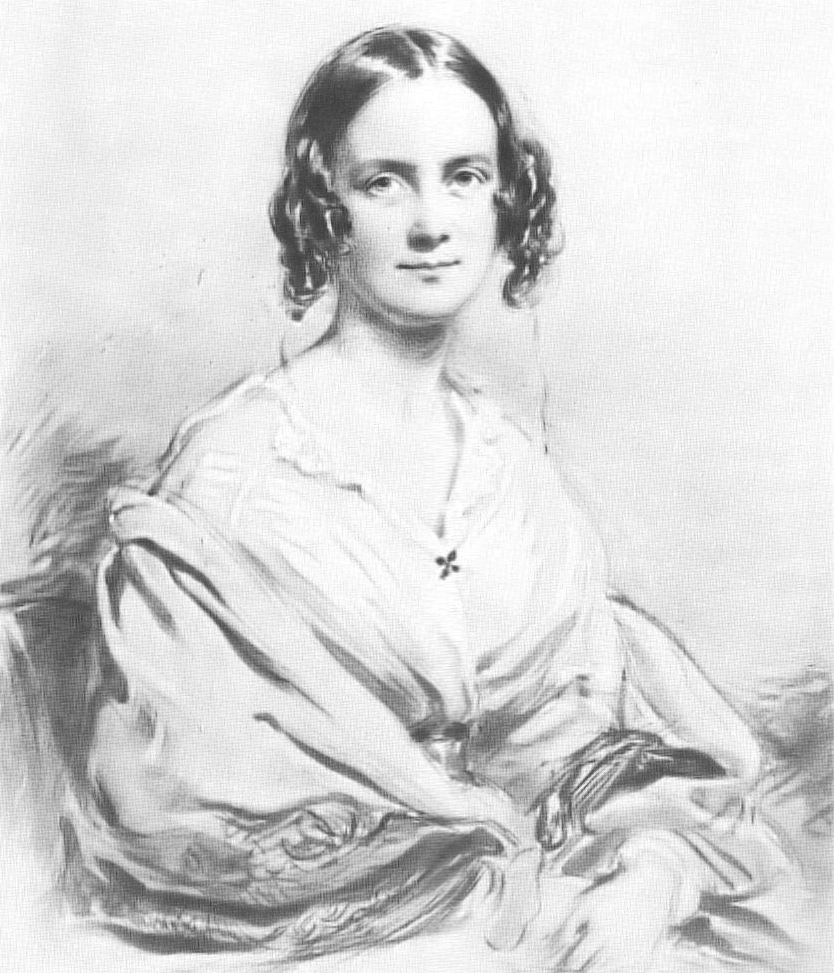
Darwin's wife Emma Wedgwood

Fully recuperated, he returned to Shrewsbury in July 1838. Used to jotting down daily notes on animal breeding, he scrawled rambling thoughts about marriage, career, and prospects on two scraps of paper, one with columns headed "Marry" and "Not Marry". Advantages under "Marry" included "constant companion and a friend in old age ... better than a dog anyhow", against points such as "less money for books" and "terrible loss of time". Having decided in favour of marriage, he discussed it with his father, then went to visit his cousin Emma on 29 July. At this time, he did not get around to proposing, but against his father's advice, he mentioned his ideas on transmutation.

=== Malthus and natural selection ===
Continuing his research in London, Darwin's wide reading now included the sixth edition of Malthus's An Essay on the Principle of Population. On 28 September 1838, he noted its assertion that human "population, when unchecked, goes on doubling itself every twenty-five years, or increases in a geometrical ratio", a geometric progression so that population soon exceeds food supply in what is known as a Malthusian catastrophe. Darwin was well-prepared to compare this to Augustin de Candolle's "warring of the species" of plants and the struggle for existence among wildlife, explaining how the numbers of a species remained roughly stable.

As species always breed beyond available resources, favourable variations would make organisms better at surviving and passing the variations on to their offspring, while unfavourable variations would be lost. He wrote that the "final cause of all this wedging, must be to sort out proper structure, & adapt it to changes", so that "One may say there is a force like a hundred thousand wedges trying [to] force into every kind of adapted structure into the gaps in the economy of nature, or rather forming gaps by thrusting out weaker ones." This would result in the formation of new species. As he later wrote in his Autobiography:

In October 1838, that is, fifteen months after I had begun my systematic enquiry, I happened to read for amusement Malthus on Population, and being well prepared to appreciate the struggle for existence which everywhere goes on from long-continued observation of the habits of animals and plants, it at once struck me that under these circumstances favourable variations would tend to be preserved, and unfavourable ones to be destroyed. The result of this would be the formation of new species. Here, then, I had at last got a theory by which to work...

By mid-December, Darwin saw a similarity between farmers picking the best stock in selective breeding, and a Malthusian Nature selecting from chance variants so that "every part of newly acquired structure is fully practical and perfected", thinking this comparison "a beautiful part of my theory". He later called his theory natural selection, an analogy with what he termed the "artificial selection" of selective breeding.

On 11 November, he returned to Maer and proposed to Emma, once more telling her his ideas. She accepted, then, in exchanges of loving letters, showed how she valued his openness in sharing their differences, while expressing her strong Unitarian beliefs and concerns that his honest doubts might separate them in the afterlife. While he was house-hunting in London, bouts of illness continued and Emma wrote urging him to get some rest, almost prophetically remarking "So don't be ill any more my dear Charley till I can be with you to nurse you." He found what they called "Macaw Cottage" (because of its gaudy interiors) in Gower Street, then moved his "museum" in over Christmas. On 24 January 1839, Darwin was elected a Fellow of the Royal Society (FRS).

On 29 January, Darwin and Emma Wedgwood were married at Maer in an Anglican ceremony arranged to suit the Unitarians, then immediately caught the train to London and their new home.

=== Geology books, barnacles, evolutionary research ===
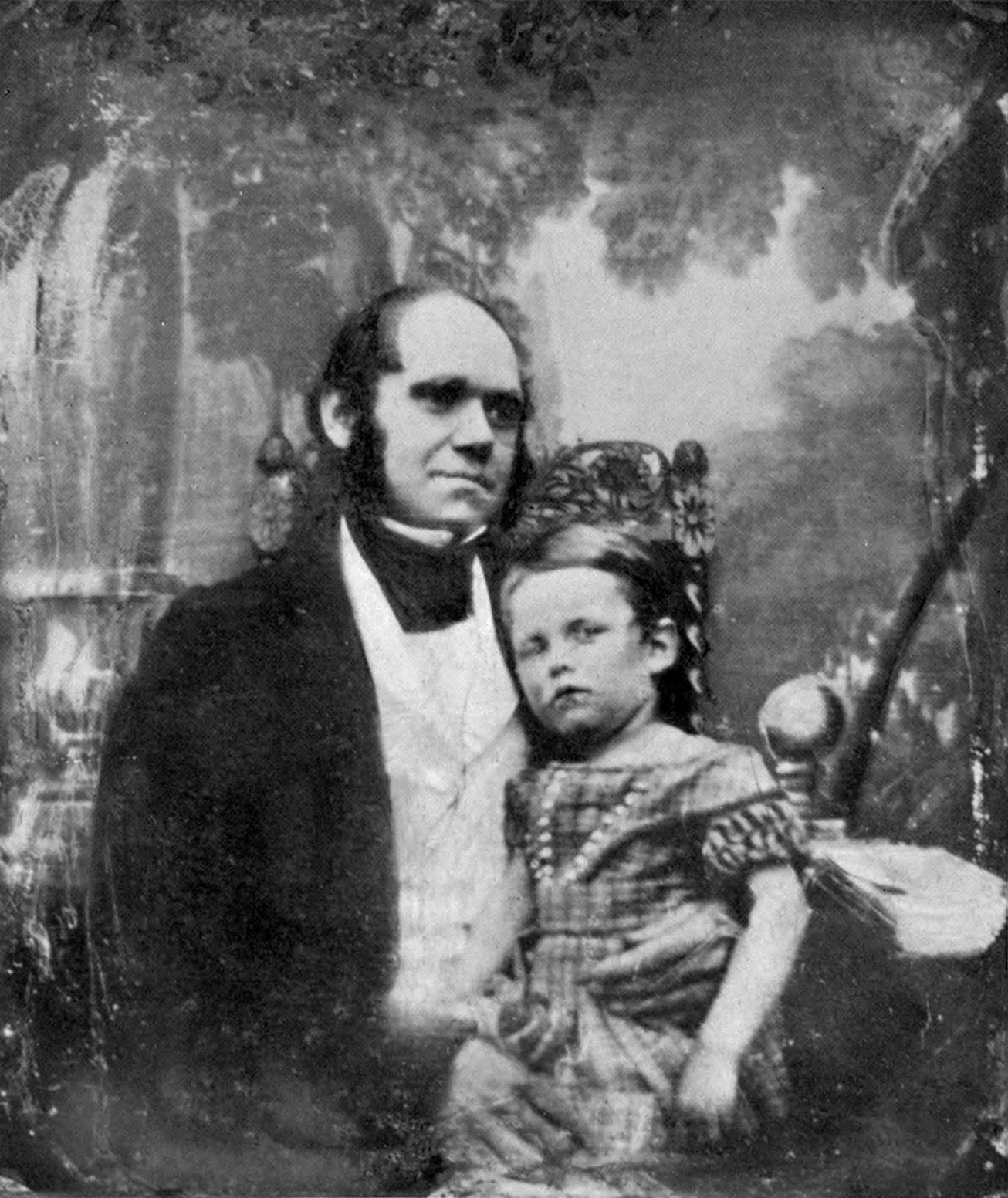
Darwin in 1842 with his eldest son, William Erasmus Darwin

Darwin now had the framework of his theory of natural selection "by which to work", as his "prime hobby". His research included extensive experimental selective breeding of plants and animals, finding evidence that species were not fixed and investigating many detailed ideas to refine and substantiate his theory. For fifteen years this work was in the background to his main occupation of writing on geology and publishing expert reports on the Beagle collections, in particular, the barnacles.

The impetus of Darwin's barnacle research came from a collection of a barnacle colony from Chile in 1835, which he dubbed Mr. Arthrobalanus. His confusion over the relationship of this species (Cryptophialus minutus) to other barnacles caused him to fixate on the systematics of the taxa. He wrote his first examination of the species in 1846, but did not formally describe it until 1854. In a letter to William Darwin Fox, Darwin wrote "I hate a Barnacle as no man ever did before, not even a Sailor in a slow-sailing ship."

FitzRoy's long-delayed Narrative was published in May 1839. Darwin's Journal and Remarks got good reviews as the third volume, and on 15 August, it was published on its own. Early in 1842, Darwin wrote about his ideas to Charles Lyell, who noted that his ally "denies seeing a beginning to each crop of species".

Darwin's book The Structure and Distribution of Coral Reefs on his theory of atoll formation was published in May 1842 after more than three years of work, and he then wrote his first "pencil sketch" of his theory of natural selection. To escape the pressures of London, the family moved to rural Down House in Kent in September. On 11 January 1844, Darwin mentioned his theorising to the botanist Joseph Dalton Hooker, writing with melodramatic humour "it is like confessing a murder". Hooker replied, "There may, in my opinion, have been a series of productions on different spots, & also a gradual change of species. I shall be delighted to hear how you think that this change may have taken place, as no presently conceived opinions satisfy me on the subject."

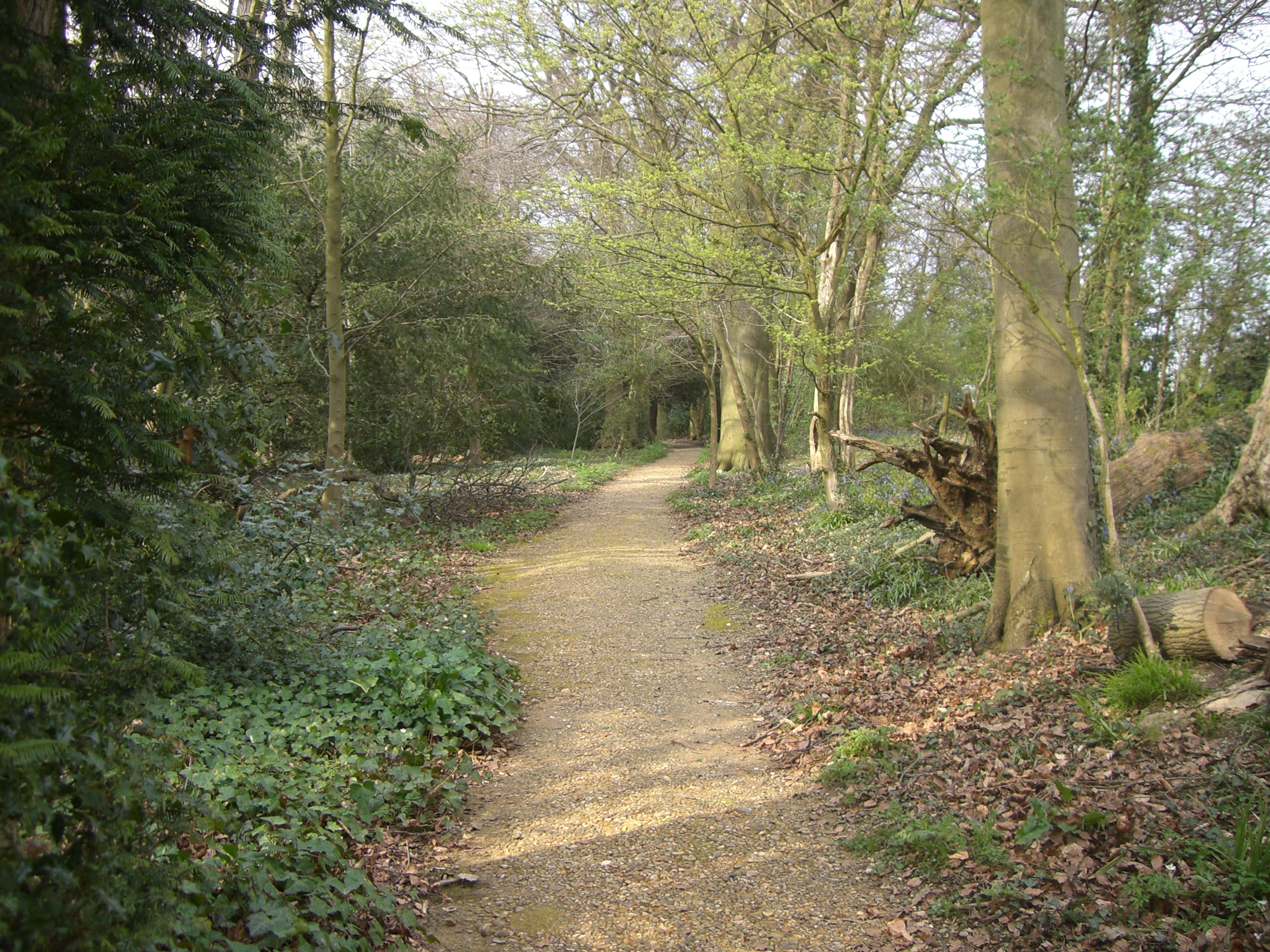
Darwin's "sandwalk" at Down House in Kent was his usual "thinking path".

By July, Darwin had expanded his "sketch" into a 230-page "Essay", to be expanded with his research results if he died prematurely. In November, the anonymously published sensational best-seller Vestiges of the Natural History of Creation brought wide interest in transmutation. Darwin scorned its amateurish geology and zoology, but carefully reviewed his own arguments. Controversy erupted, and it continued to sell well despite contemptuous dismissal by scientists.

Darwin completed his third geological book in 1846. He now renewed his interest in marine invertebrates and, using expertise from his student days with Grant, dissected and classified the barnacles he had collected on the voyage. He enjoyed observing their beauty and thought about comparisons with allied structures. In 1847, Hooker read the "Essay" and sent notes that provided Darwin with the calm critical feedback that he needed, but would not commit himself and questioned Darwin's opposition to continuing acts of creation.

In an attempt to improve his chronic ill health, Darwin went in 1849 to Dr. James Gully's Malvern spa and was surprised to find some benefit from hydrotherapy. Then, in 1851, his treasured daughter Annie fell ill, reawakening his fears that his illness might be hereditary. She died the same year after a long series of crises.

In eight years of work on barnacles, Darwin's theory helped him to find "homologies" showing that slightly changed body parts served different functions to meet new conditions. In some genera he found minute males parasitic on hermaphrodites, showing an intermediate stage in evolution of distinct sexes. In 1853, it earned him the Royal Society's Royal Medal, and it made his reputation as a biologist. Upon the conclusion of his research, Darwin declared, "I hate a barnacle as no man ever did before." In 1854, he became a Fellow of the Linnean Society of London, gaining postal access to its library. He began a major reassessment of his theory of species, and in November realised that divergence in the character of descendants could be explained by them becoming adapted to "diversified places in the economy of nature".

=== Publication of the theory of natural selection ===
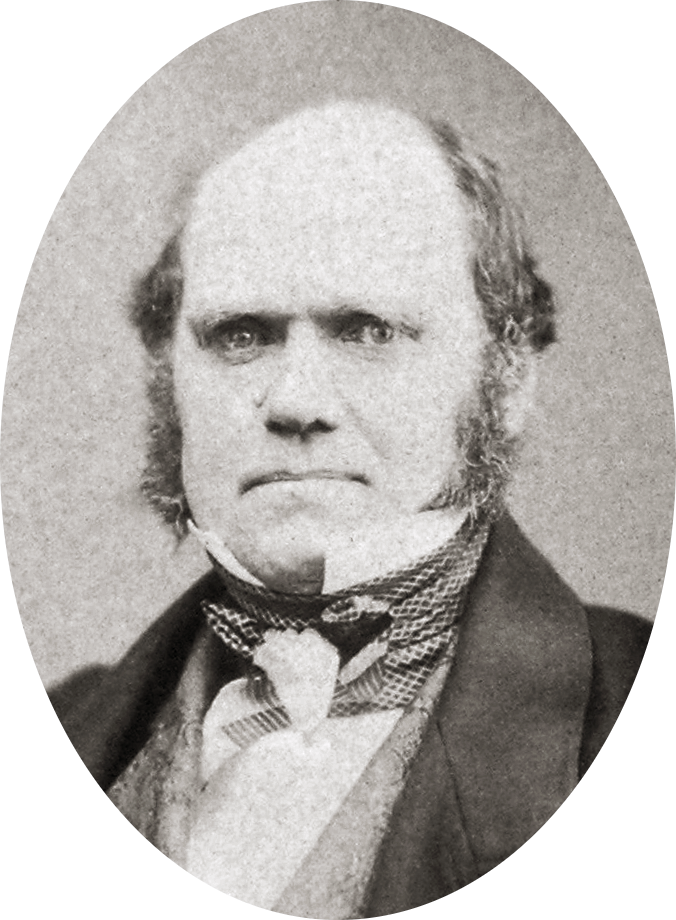
Darwin aged 46 in 1855, by then working towards publication of his theory of natural selection. He wrote to Joseph Hooker about this portrait, "if I really have as bad an expression, as my photograph gives me, how I can have one single friend is surprising."

By the start of 1856, Darwin was investigating whether eggs and seeds could survive travel across seawater to spread species across oceans. Hooker increasingly doubted the traditional view that species were fixed, but their young friend Thomas Henry Huxley was still firmly against the transmutation of species. Lyell was intrigued by Darwin's speculations without realising their extent. When he read a paper by Alfred Russel Wallace, "On the Law which has Regulated the Introduction of New Species", he saw similarities with Darwin's thoughts. He urged him to publish to establish precedence.

Though Darwin saw no threat, on 14 May 1856, he began writing a short paper. Finding answers to difficult questions held him up repeatedly, and he expanded his plans to a "big book on species" titled Natural Selection, which was to include his "note on Man". He continued his research, obtaining information and specimens from naturalists worldwide, including Wallace, who was working in Borneo.

In mid-1857, he added a section heading, "Theory applied to Races of Man", but did not add text on this topic. On 5 September 1857, Darwin sent the American botanist Asa Gray a detailed outline of his ideas, including an abstract of Natural Selection, which omitted human origins and sexual selection. In December, Darwin received a letter from Wallace asking if the book would examine human origins. He responded that he would avoid that subject, "so surrounded with prejudices", while encouraging Wallace's theorising and adding that "I go much further than you."

Darwin's book was only partly written when, on 18 June 1858, he received a paper from Wallace describing natural selection. Shocked that he had been "forestalled", Darwin sent it on that day to Lyell, as requested by Wallace. Although Wallace had not asked for publication, Darwin suggested he would send it to any journal that Wallace chose. His family was in crisis, with children in the village dying of scarlet fever, and he put matters in the hands of his friends.

After some discussion, with no reliable way of involving Wallace, Lyell and Hooker decided on a joint presentation at the Linnean Society on 1 July of On the Tendency of Species to form Varieties; and on the Perpetuation of Varieties and Species by Natural Means of Selection. On the evening of 28 June, Darwin's baby son died of scarlet fever after almost a week of severe illness, and he was too distraught to attend.

There was little immediate attention to this announcement of the theory; the president of the Linnean Society remarked in May 1859 that the year had not been marked by any revolutionary discoveries. Only one review rankled enough for Darwin to recall it later; Professor Samuel Haughton of Dublin claimed that "all that was new in them was false, and what was true was old". Darwin struggled for thirteen months to produce an abstract of his "big book", suffering from ill health but getting constant encouragement from his scientific friends. Lyell arranged to have it published by John Murray.

On the Origin of Species proved unexpectedly popular, with the entire stock of 1,250 copies oversubscribed when it went on sale to booksellers on 22 November 1859. In the book, Darwin set out "one long argument" of detailed observations, inferences and consideration of anticipated objections. In making the case for common descent, he included evidence of homologies between humans and other mammals.^{[III]} Having outlined sexual selection, he hinted that it could explain differences between human races.^{[IV]} He avoided explicit discussion of human origins, but implied the significance of his work with the sentence; "Light will be thrown on the origin of man and his history."^{[IV]} His theory is simply stated in the introduction:

As many more individuals of each species are born than can possibly survive; and as, consequently, there is a frequently recurring struggle for existence, it follows that any being, if it vary however slightly in any manner profitable to itself, under the complex and sometimes varying conditions of life, will have a better chance of surviving, and thus be naturally selected. From the strong principle of inheritance, any selected variety will tend to propagate its new and modified form.

At the end of the book, he concluded that:

There is grandeur in this view of life, with its several powers, having been originally breathed into a few forms or into one; and that, whilst this planet has gone cycling on according to the fixed law of gravity, from so simple a beginning endless forms most beautiful and most wonderful have been, and are being, evolved.

The last word was the only variant of "evolved" in the first five editions of the book. "Evolutionism" at that time was associated with other concepts, most commonly with embryological development. Darwin first used the word evolution in The Descent of Man in 1871, before adding it in 1872 to the 6th edition of The Origin of Species.

=== Responses to publication ===
The book aroused international interest, with less controversy than had greeted the popular and less scientific Vestiges of the Natural History of Creation. Though Darwin's illness kept him away from the public debates, he eagerly scrutinised the scientific response, commenting on press cuttings, reviews, articles, satires and caricatures, and corresponded on it with colleagues worldwide. The book did not explicitly discuss human origins,^{[IV]} but included a number of hints about the animal ancestry of humans from which the inference could be made. Upon reading it, Huxley remarked "How extremely stupid not to have thought of that!"

The first review asked, "If a monkey has become a man – what may not a man become?" It said this should be left to theologians as being too dangerous for ordinary readers. Among early favourable responses, Huxley's reviews swiped at Richard Owen, leader of the scientific establishment which Huxley was trying to overthrow.

In April, Owen's review attacked Darwin's friends and condescendingly dismissed his ideas, angering Darwin, but Owen and others began to promote ideas of supernaturally guided evolution. Patrick Matthew drew attention to his 1831 book, which had a brief appendix suggesting a concept of natural selection leading to new species, but he had not developed the idea.

The Church of England's response was mixed. Darwin's old Cambridge tutors Sedgwick and Henslow dismissed the ideas, but liberal clergymen interpreted natural selection as an instrument of God's design, with the cleric Charles Kingsley seeing it as "just as noble a conception of Deity". In 1860, the publication of Essays and Reviews by seven liberal Anglican theologians diverted clerical attention from Darwin. Its ideas, including higher criticism, were attacked by church authorities as heresy. In it, Baden Powell argued that miracles broke God's laws, so belief in them was atheistic, and praised "Mr Darwin's masterly volume [supporting] the grand principle of the self-evolving powers of nature".

Asa Gray discussed teleology with Darwin, who imported and distributed Gray's pamphlet on theistic evolution, Natural Selection is not inconsistent with natural theology. The most famous confrontation was at the public 1860 Oxford evolution debate during a meeting of the British Association for the Advancement of Science, where the Bishop of Oxford Samuel Wilberforce, though not opposed to transmutation of species, argued against Darwin's explanation and human descent from apes. Joseph Hooker argued strongly for Darwin, and Thomas Huxley's legendary retort, that he would rather be descended from an ape than a man who misused his gifts, came to symbolise a triumph of science over religion.

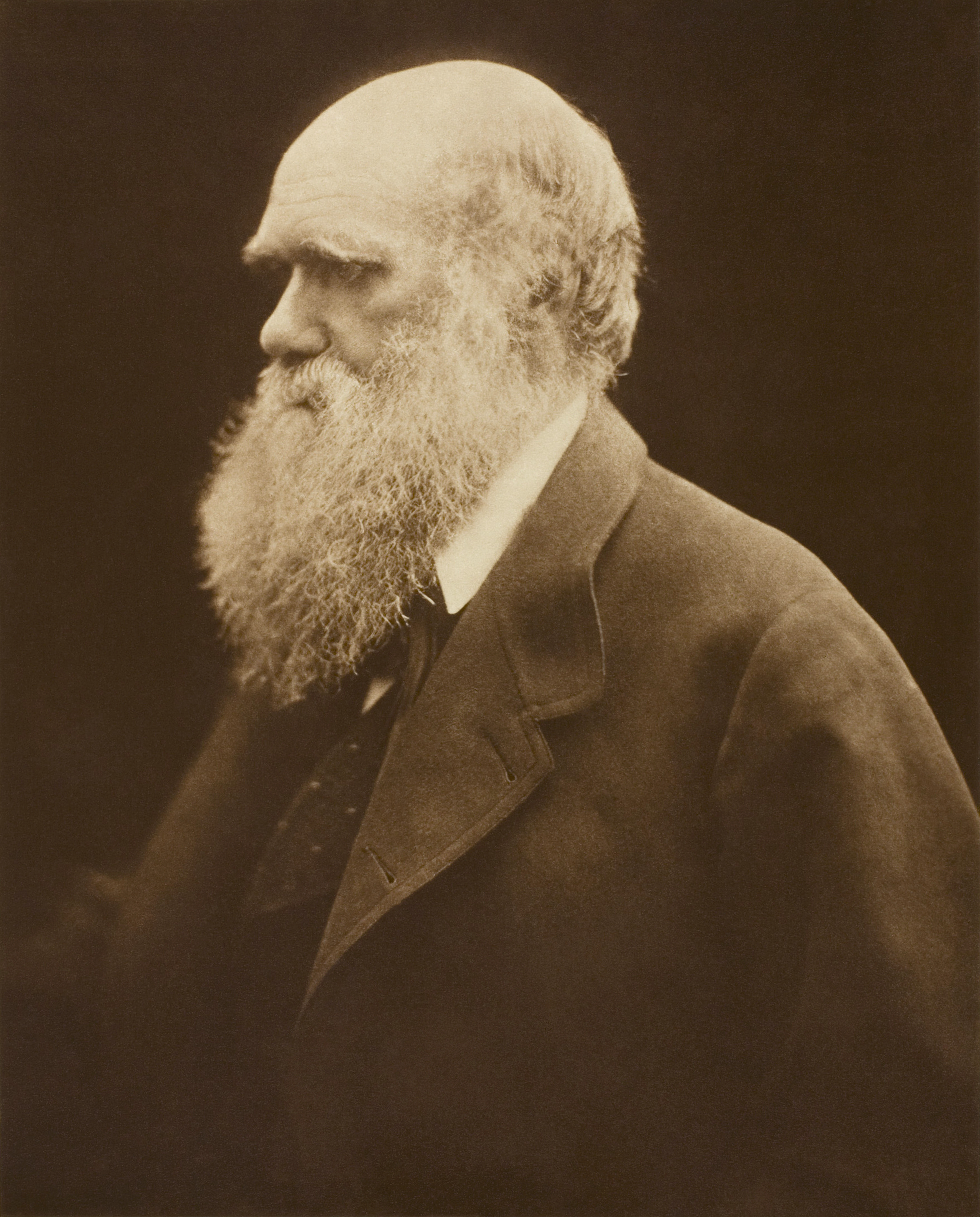
In 1862 Darwin began growing his beard, as seen in the 1868 portrait by Julia Margaret Cameron.

Typical caricatures of Darwin with an ape body identified him in popular culture as the leading author of evolutionary theory. This 1871 cartoon followed publication of The Descent of Man.

Even Darwin's close friends Gray, Hooker, Huxley, and Lyell still expressed various reservations but gave strong support, as did many others, particularly younger naturalists. Gray and Lyell sought reconciliation with faith, while Huxley portrayed a polarisation between religion and science. He campaigned pugnaciously against the authority of the clergy in education, aiming to overturn the dominance of clergymen and aristocratic amateurs under Owen in favour of a new generation of professional scientists. Owen's claim that brain anatomy proved humans to be a separate biological order from apes was shown to be false by Huxley in a long-running dispute parodied by Kingsley as the "Great Hippocampus Question", and discredited Owen.

In response to objections that the origin of life was unexplained, Darwin pointed to acceptance of Newton's law even though the cause of gravity was unknown. Despite criticisms and reservations related to this topic, he nevertheless proposed a prescient idea in an 1871 letter to Hooker in which he suggested the origin of life may have occurred in a "warm little pond".

Darwinism became a movement covering a wide range of evolutionary ideas. In 1863, Lyell's Geological Evidences of the Antiquity of Man popularised prehistory, though his caution on evolution disappointed Darwin. Weeks later, Huxley's Evidence as to Man's Place in Nature showed that anatomically, humans are apes. Then, The Naturalist on the River Amazons by Henry Walter Bates provided empirical evidence of natural selection.

Following the publication of On the Origin of Species, both Prince Albert, who supported Darwin's ideas, and the Prime Minister, Lord Palmerston, recommended Darwin for a knighthood but without success; among the opponents of the proposed honour was Bishop Wilberforce.

Later lobbying brought Darwin Britain's highest scientific honour, the Royal Society's Copley Medal, awarded on 3 November 1864. That day, Huxley held the first meeting of what became the influential "X Club" devoted to "science, pure and free, untrammelled by religious dogmas". By the end of the 1860s, most scientists agreed that evolution occurred, but only a minority supported Darwin's view that the chief mechanism was natural selection.

On the Origin of Species was translated into many languages, becoming a staple scientific text attracting thoughtful attention from all walks of life, including the "working men" who flocked to Huxley's lectures. Darwin's theory resonated with various movements at the time^{[V]} and became a key fixture of popular culture.^{[VI]} Cartoonists parodied animal ancestry in an old tradition of showing humans with animal traits, and in Britain, these droll images served to popularise Darwin's theory in an unthreatening way. Darwin had started growing a beard during illness in 1862. After he reappeared in public in 1866, caricatures of him as an ape helped to identify all forms of evolutionism with Darwinism.

Othniel C. Marsh, America's first palaeontologist, was the first to provide solid fossil evidence to support Darwin's theory of evolution by unearthing the ancestors of the modern horse. In 1877, Marsh delivered a very influential speech before the annual meeting of the American Association for the Advancement of Science, providing a demonstrative argument for evolution. For the first time, Marsh traced the evolution of vertebrates from fish all the way through humans. Sparing no detail, he listed a wealth of fossil examples of past life forms. The significance of this speech was immediately recognized by the scientific community, and it was printed in its entirety in several scientific journals.

=== Descent of Man, sexual selection, and botany ===
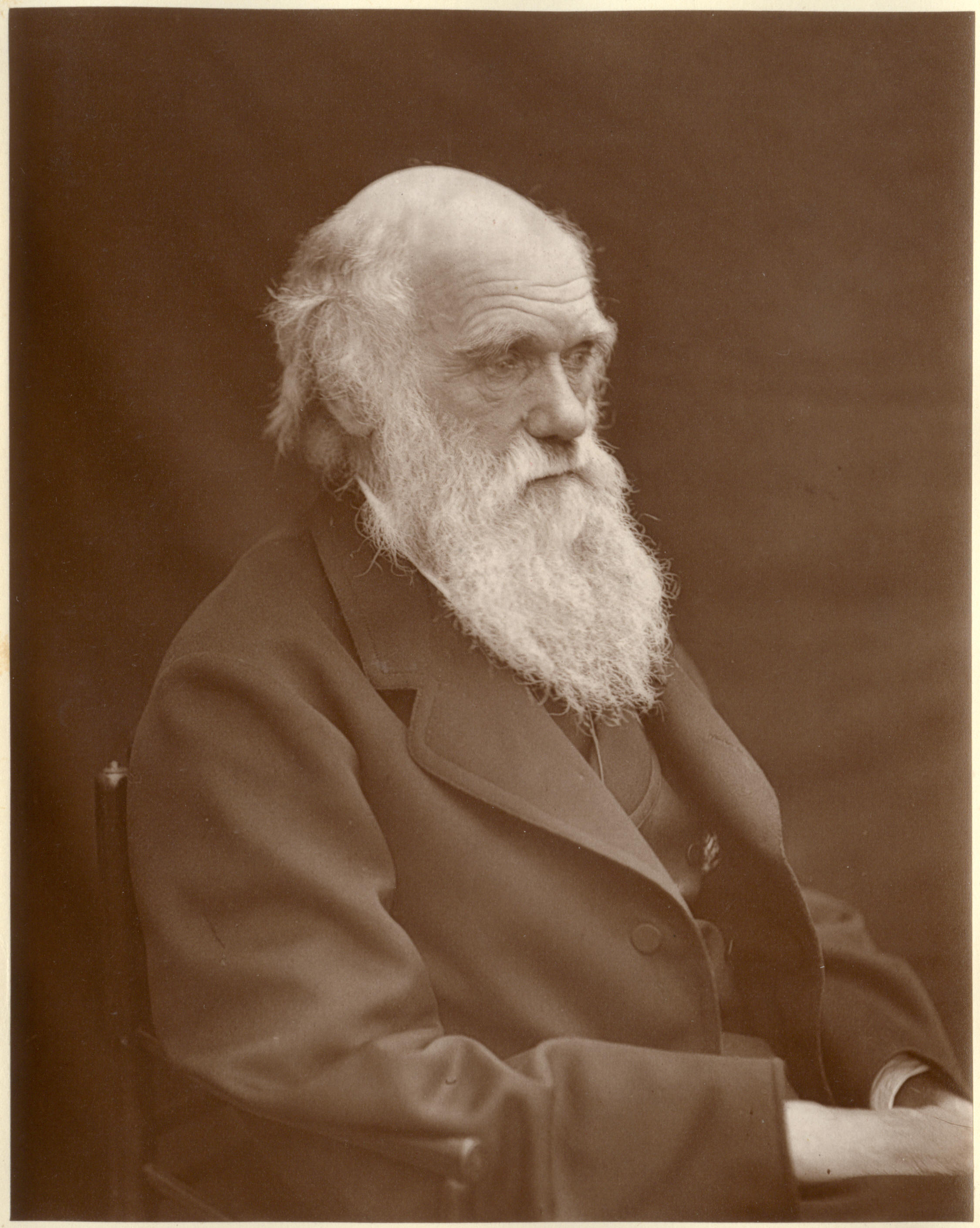
By 1878, an increasingly famous Darwin had suffered years of illness.

Despite repeated bouts of illness during the last twenty-two years of his life, Darwin's work continued. Having published On the Origin of Species as an abstract of his theory, he pressed on with experiments, research, and writing of his "big book". He covered human descent from earlier animals, including the evolution of society and of mental abilities, as well as explaining decorative beauty in wildlife and diversifying into innovative plant studies.

Enquiries about insect pollination led in 1861 to novel studies of wild orchids, showing adaptation of their flowers to attract specific moths to each species and ensure cross-fertilisation. In 1862, Fertilisation of Orchids gave his first detailed demonstration of the power of natural selection to explain complex ecological relationships, making testable predictions. Explorers in Madagascar had discovered an orchid, Angraecum sesquipedale, with a sixteen-inch-long nectary. Darwin predicted the existence of a moth with a proboscis long enough to pollinate it; the pollen "would not be withdrawn until some huge moth, with a wonderfully long proboscis, tried to drain the last drop." Explorers in Madagascar discovered Xanthopan in 1903. As his health declined, he lay on his sickbed in a room filled with inventive experiments to trace the movements of climbing plants. Admiring visitors included Ernst Haeckel, a zealous proponent of Darwinism incorporating Lamarckism and Goethe's idealism. Wallace remained supportive, though he increasingly turned to Spiritualism.

Darwin's book The Variation of Animals and Plants Under Domestication (1868) was the first part of his planned "big book", and included his unsuccessful hypothesis of pangenesis attempting to explain heredity. It sold briskly at first, despite its size, and was translated into many languages. He wrote most of a second part, on natural selection, but it remained unpublished in his lifetime.

Lyell had already popularised human prehistory, and Huxley had shown that anatomically humans are apes. With The Descent of Man, and Selection in Relation to Sex published in 1871, Darwin set out evidence from numerous sources that humans are animals, showing continuity of physical and mental attributes, and presented sexual selection to explain impractical animal features such as the peacock's plumage as well as human evolution of culture, differences between sexes, and physical and cultural racial classification, while emphasising that humans are all one species.

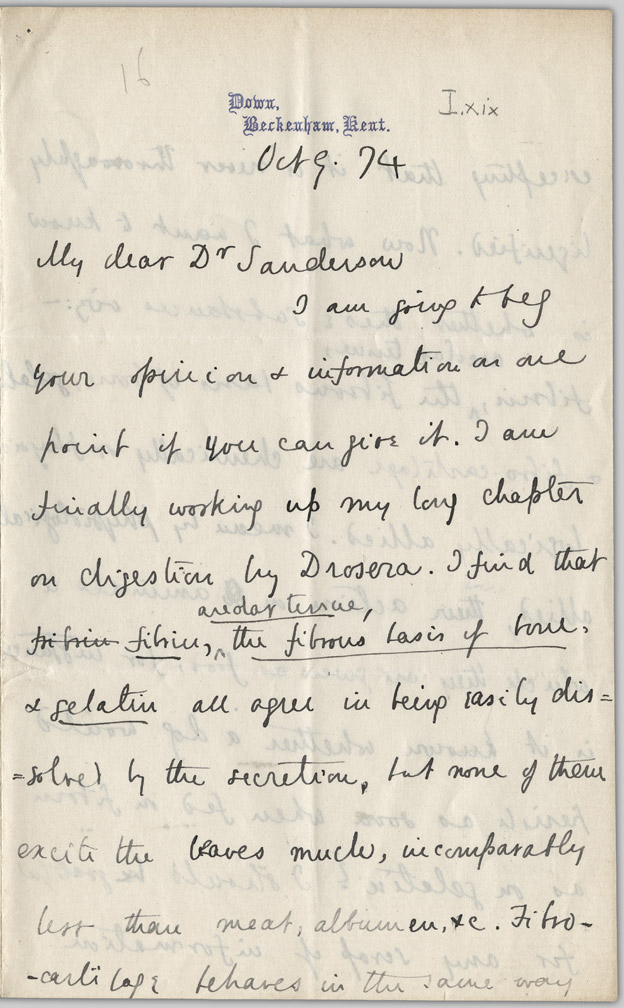
Letter of enquiry from Charles Darwin to the physiologist John Burdon-Sanderson

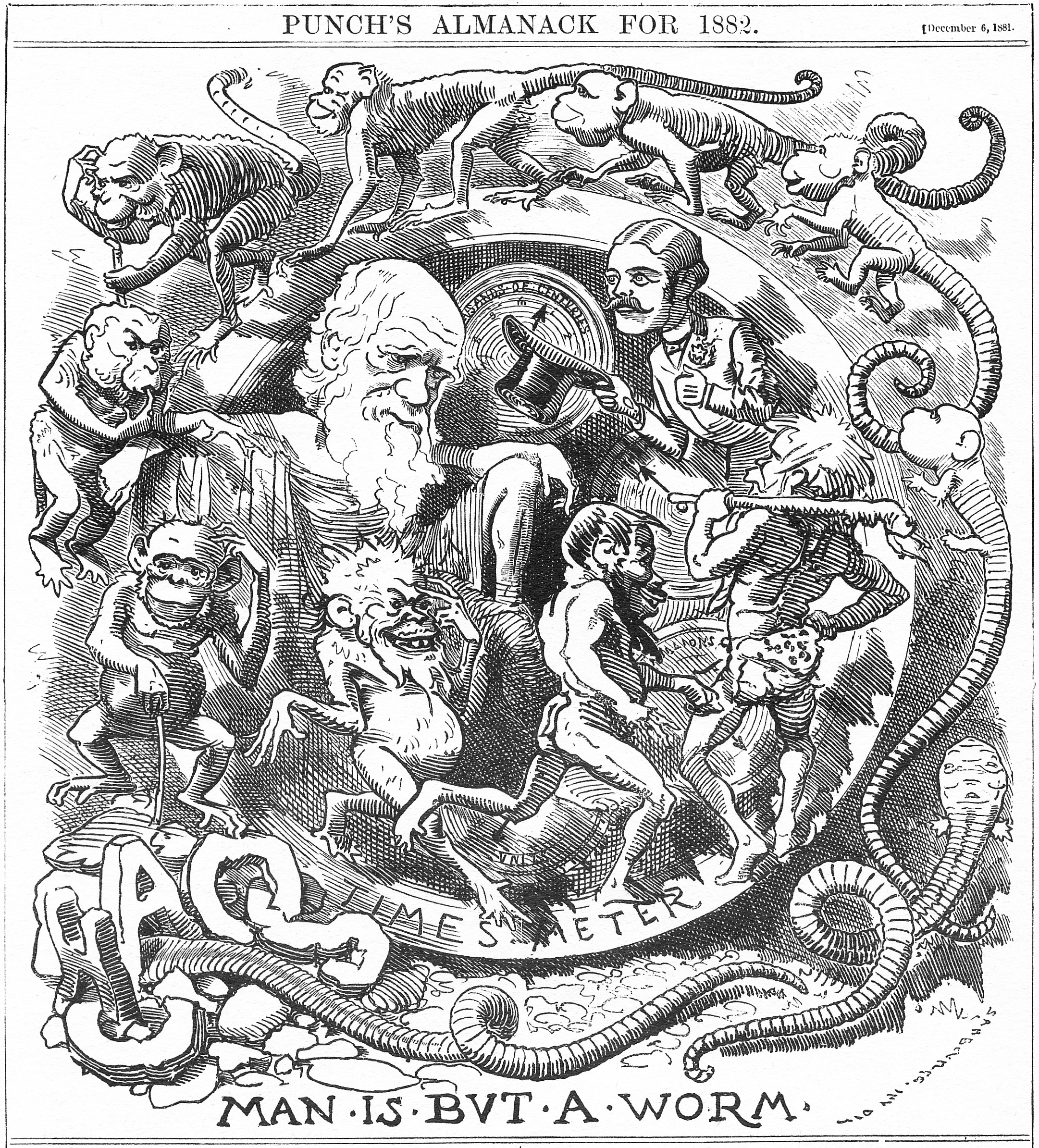
Punch's almanac for 1882, published shortly before Darwin's death, depicts him amidst evolution from chaos to Victorian gentleman with the title Man Is But A Worm.

His research using images was expanded in his 1872 book The Expression of the Emotions in Man and Animals, one of the first books to feature printed photographs, which discussed the evolution of human psychology and its continuity with the behaviour of animals. Both books proved very popular, and Darwin was impressed by the general assent with which his views had been received, remarking that "everybody is talking about it without being shocked." His conclusion was "that man with all his noble qualities, with sympathy which feels for the most debased, with benevolence which extends not only to other men but to the humblest living creature, with his god-like intellect which has penetrated into the movements and constitution of the solar system – with all these exalted powers – Man still bears in his bodily frame the indelible stamp of his lowly origin."

His evolution-related experiments and investigations led to books on Insectivorous Plants, The Effects of Cross and Self Fertilisation in the Vegetable Kingdom, different forms of flowers on plants of the same species, and The Power of Movement in Plants. He continued to collect information and exchange views from scientific correspondents all over the world, including Mary Treat, whom he encouraged to persevere in her scientific work. He was the first person to recognise the significance of carnivory in plants. His botanical work^{[IX]} was interpreted and popularised by various writers including Grant Allen and H. G. Wells, and helped transform plant science in the late 19th century and early 20th century.

=== Death and funeral ===
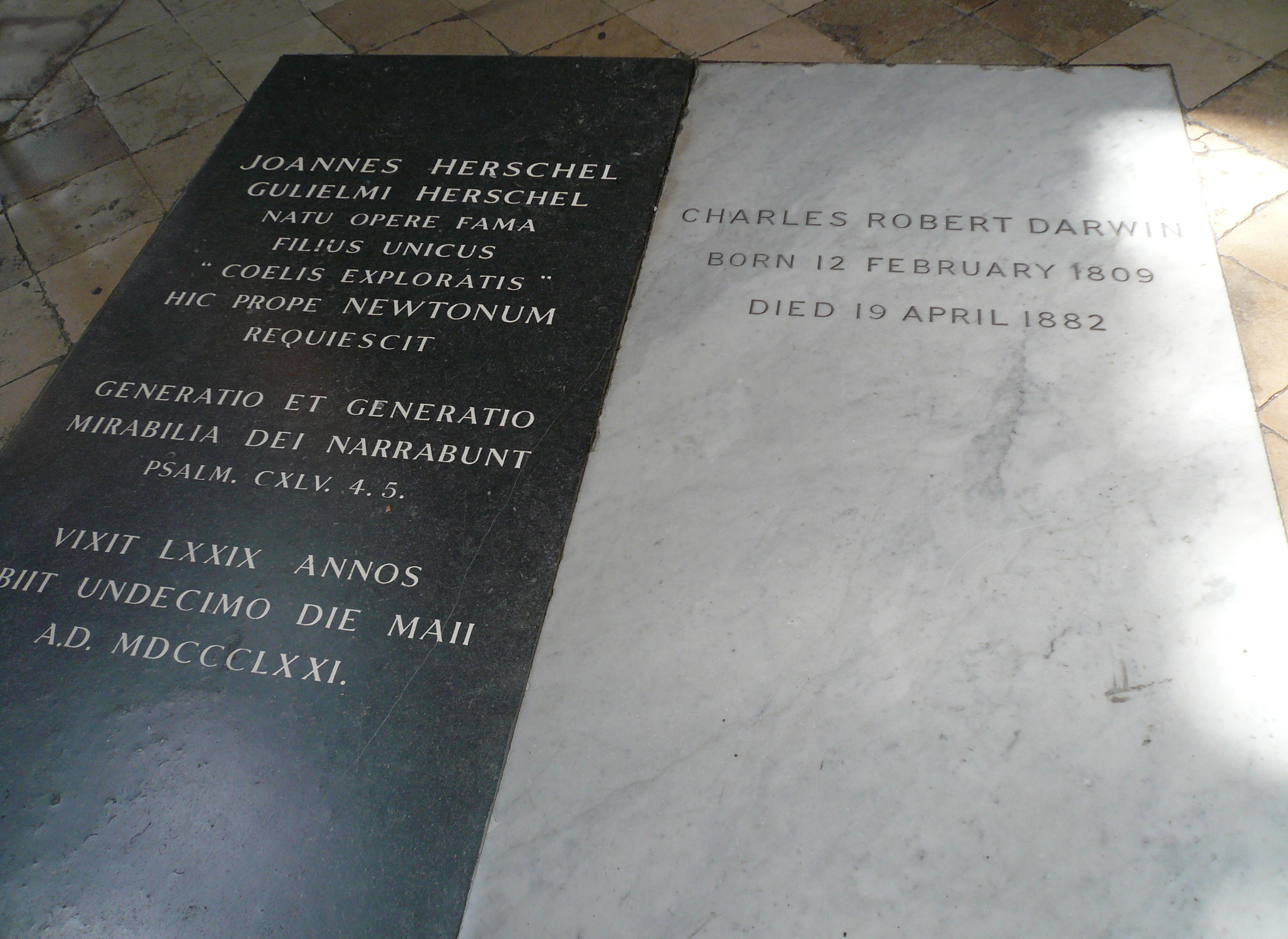
The adjoining tombs of the scientists John Herschel and Charles Darwin in the nave of Westminster Abbey, London

In 1882, Darwin was diagnosed with what was called "angina pectoris" which then meant coronary thrombosis and disease of the heart. At the time of his death, the physicians diagnosed "anginal attacks" and "heart-failure"; there has since been scholarly speculation about his life-long health issues.

Darwin died at Down House on 19 April 1882, aged 73. His last words were to his family, telling Emma, "I am not the least afraid of death—Remember what a good wife you have been to me—Tell all my children to remember how good they have been to me". While she rested, he repeatedly told Henrietta and Francis, "It's almost worthwhile to be sick to be nursed by you".

He had expected to be buried in St Mary's churchyard at Downe, but at the request of Darwin's colleagues, after public and parliamentary petitioning, William Spottiswoode (President of the Royal Society) arranged for Darwin to be honoured by burial in Westminster Abbey, close to John Herschel and Isaac Newton. The funeral, held on Wednesday, 26 April, was attended by thousands of people, including family, friends, scientists, philosophers, and dignitaries.

== Children ==
William Erasmus Darwin	27 December 1839 –	8 September 1914
Anne Elizabeth Darwin	2 March 1841 –	23 April 1851
Mary Eleanor Darwin	23 September 1842 –	16 October 1842
Henrietta Emma Darwin	25 September 1843 –	17 December 1927
George Howard Darwin	9 July 1845 –	7 December 1912
Elizabeth Darwin	8 July 1847 –	8 June 1926
Francis Darwin	16 August 1848 –	19 September 1925
Leonard Darwin	15 January 1850 –	26 March 1943
Horace Darwin	13 May 1851 –	29 September 1928
Charles Waring Darwin	6 December 1856 –	28 June 1858

The Darwins had ten children: two died in infancy, and Annie's death at the age of ten had a devastating effect on her parents. Charles was a devoted father and uncommonly attentive to his children. Whenever they fell ill, he feared that they might have inherited weaknesses from inbreeding due to the close family ties he shared with his wife and cousin, Emma Wedgwood. He examined inbreeding in his writings, contrasting it with the advantages of outcrossing in many species.

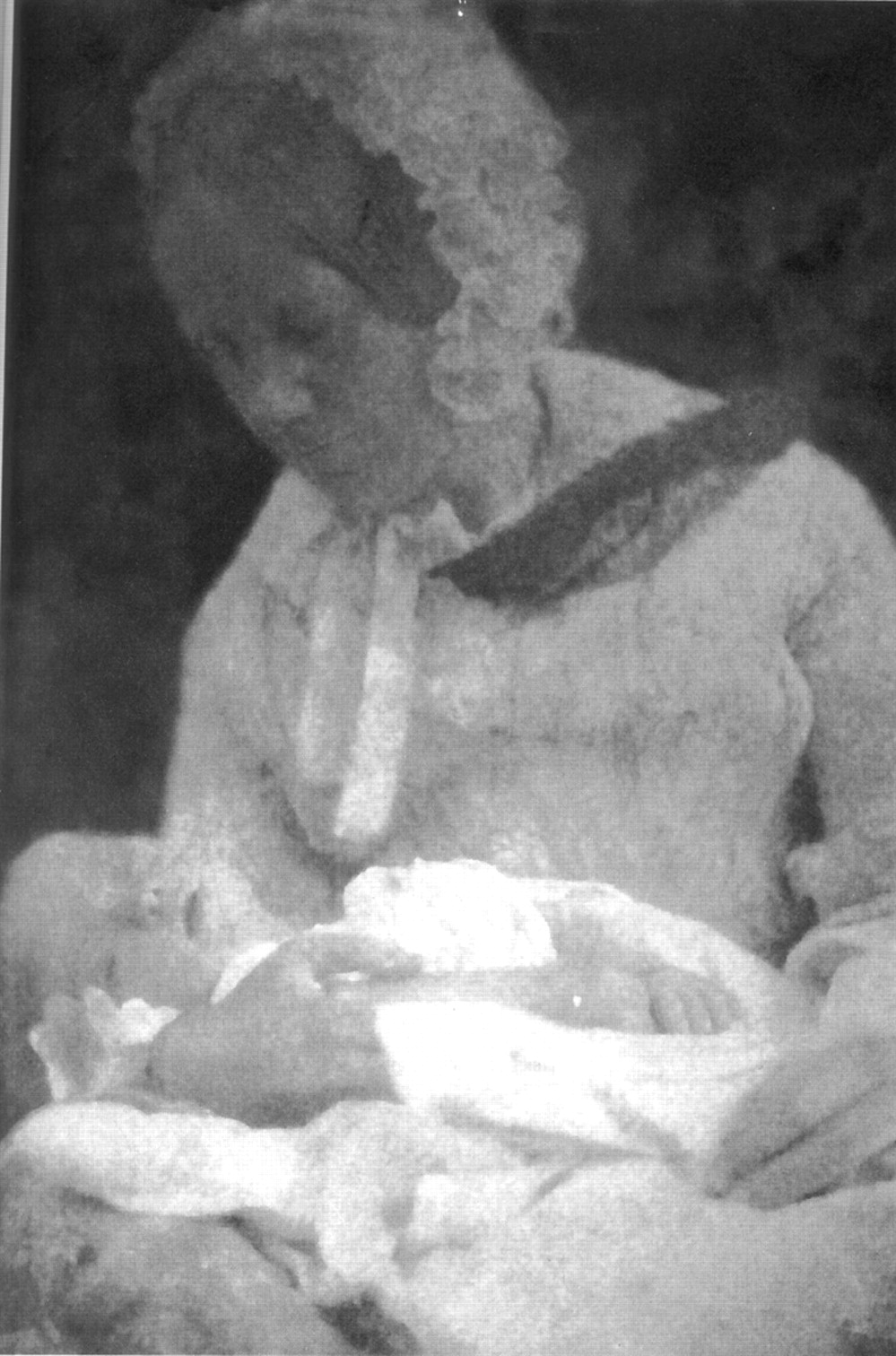
Emma Darwin with Charles Waring Darwin

Charles Waring Darwin, born in December 1856, was the tenth and last of the children. Emma Darwin was aged 48 at the time of the birth, and the child was mentally subnormal and never learnt to walk or talk. He probably had Down syndrome, which had not then been medically described. The evidence is a photograph by William Erasmus Darwin of the infant and his mother, showing a characteristic head shape, and the family's observations of the child. Charles Waring died of scarlet fever on 28 June 1858, when Darwin wrote in his journal: "Poor dear Baby died."

Of his surviving children, George, Francis and Horace became Fellows of the Royal Society, distinguished as an astronomer, botanist and civil engineer, respectively. All three were knighted. Another son, Leonard, went on to be a soldier, politician, economist, eugenicist, and mentor of the statistician and evolutionary biologist Ronald Fisher.

== Views and opinions ==
=== Religious views ===
Darwin's family tradition was nonconformist Unitarianism, while his father and grandfather were freethinkers, and his baptism and boarding school were Church of England. When going to Cambridge to become an Anglican clergyman, he did not "in the least doubt the strict and literal truth of every word in the Bible". He learned John Herschel's science which, like William Paley's natural theology, sought explanations in laws of nature rather than miracles and saw adaptation of species as evidence of design. On board HMS Beagle, Darwin was quite orthodox and would quote the Bible as an authority on morality. He looked for "centres of creation" to explain distribution, and suggested that the very similar antlions found in Australia and England were evidence of a divine hand.

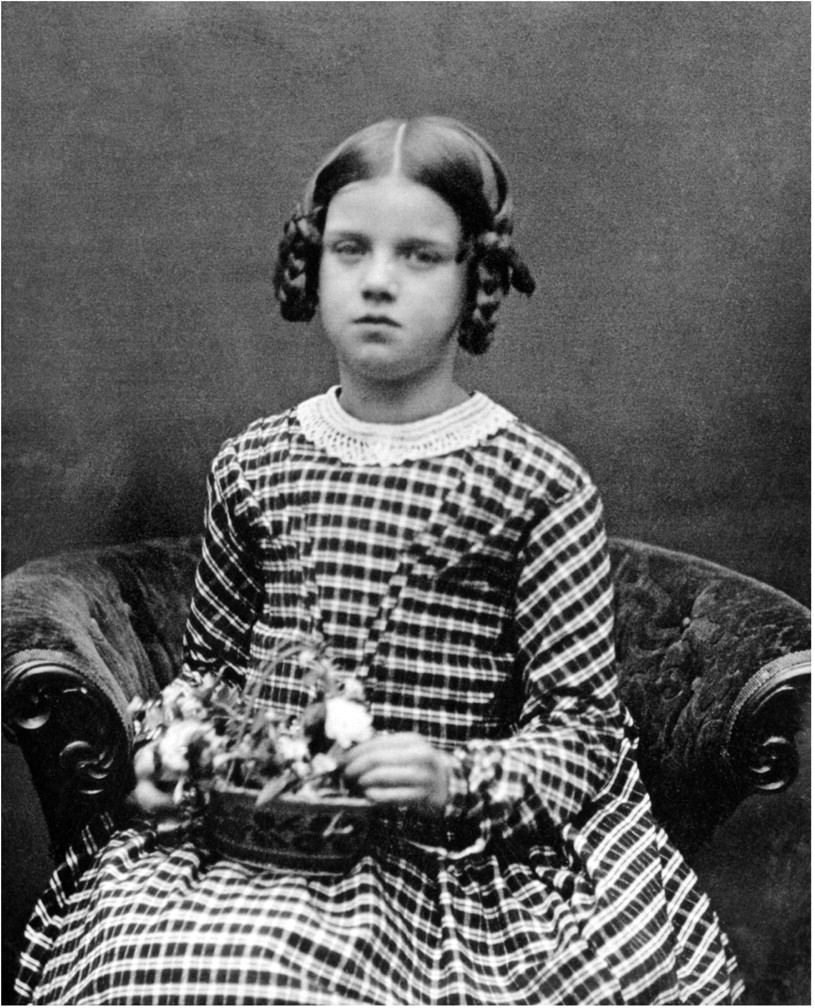
In 1851, Darwin was devastated when his daughter Annie died; by then his faith in Christianity had dwindled, and he had stopped going to church.

Upon his return, he expressed a critical view of the Bible's historical accuracy and questioned the basis for considering one religion more valid than another. In the next few years, while intensively speculating on geology and the transmutation of species, he gave much thought to religion and openly discussed this with his wife Emma, whose beliefs similarly came from intensive study and questioning.

The theodicy of Paley and Thomas Malthus vindicated evils such as starvation as a result of a benevolent creator's laws, which had an overall good effect. To Darwin, natural selection produced the good of adaptation but removed the need for design. He was increasingly troubled by the problem of evil and he could not see the work of an omnipotent deity in all the pain and suffering, such as the ichneumon wasp paralysing caterpillars as live food for its eggs. Though he thought of religion as a tribal survival strategy, in a letter to Asa Gray in 1860, Darwin also confessed that he could not "anyhow be contented to view this wonderful universe (as) the result of brute force," making him reluctant to give up the idea of God as an ultimate lawgiver.

Darwin remained close friends with the vicar of Downe, John Brodie Innes, and continued to play a leading part in the parish work of the church, but from c. 1849 would go for a walk on Sundays while his family attended church. He considered it "absurd to doubt that a man might be an ardent theist and an evolutionist" and, though reticent about his religious views, in a letter to John Fordyce in 1879, he wrote that "I have never been an atheist in the sense of denying the existence of a God. – I think that generally ... an agnostic would be the most correct description of my state of mind".

At other times he believed in a First Cause:

This follows from the extreme difficulty, or rather the impossibility, of conceiving this immense and wonderful universe, including man with his capacity for looking far backwards and far into futurity, as the result of blind chance or necessity. When thus reflecting I feel compelled to look to a First Cause having an intelligent mind in some degree analogous to that of man; and I deserve to be called a Theist. This conclusion was strong in my mind about the time, as far as I can remember, when I wrote the Origin of Species; and it is since that time that it has very gradually with many fluctuations become weaker. [...] I cannot pretend to throw the least light on such abstruse problems. The mystery of the beginning of all things is insoluble by us; and I for one must be content to remain an Agnostic.

The "Lady Hope Story", published in 1915, claimed that Darwin had reverted to Christianity on his sickbed. The claims were repudiated by Darwin's children and have been dismissed as false by historians.

=== Human society ===
Darwin's views on social and political issues reflected his time and social position. He grew up in a family of Whig reformers who, like his uncle Josiah Wedgwood, supported electoral reform and the emancipation of slaves. Darwin was passionately opposed to slavery.

Taking taxidermy lessons in 1826 from the freed slave John Edmonstone, whom Darwin long recalled as "a very pleasant and intelligent man", reinforced his belief that black people shared the same feelings, and could be as intelligent as people of other races. He took the same attitude to native people he met on the Beagle voyage. Though commonplace in Britain at the time, Silliman and Bachman noticed the contrast with slave-owning America. Around twenty years later, racism became a feature of British society, but Darwin remained strongly against slavery, against "ranking the so-called races of man as distinct species", and against ill-treatment of native people.^{[VII]}

Darwin's interaction with Yaghans (Fuegians) such as Jemmy Button during the second voyage of HMS Beagle had a profound impact on his view of indigenous peoples. At his arrival in Tierra del Fuego, he made a colourful description of "Fuegian savages". This view changed as he came to know the Yaghan people more in detail. By studying the Yaghans, Darwin concluded that a number of basic emotions by different human groups were the same and that mental capabilities were roughly the same as for Europeans. While interested in Yaghan culture, Darwin failed to appreciate their deep ecological knowledge and elaborate cosmology until the 1850s when he inspected a dictionary of Yaghan detailing 32,000 words. He saw that European colonisation would often lead to the extinction of native civilisations, and "tr[ied] to integrate colonialism into an evolutionary history of civilization analogous to natural history".

Darwin's view of women was that men's eminence over them was the outcome of sexual selection, a view disputed by Antoinette Brown Blackwell in her 1875 book The Sexes Throughout Nature.

Darwin was intrigued by his half-cousin Francis Galton's argument, introduced in 1865, that statistical analysis of heredity showed that moral and mental human traits could be inherited, and principles of animal breeding could apply to humans. In The Descent of Man, Darwin noted that aiding the weak to survive and have families could lose the benefits of natural selection, but cautioned that withholding such aid would endanger the instinct of sympathy, "the noblest part of our nature", and factors such as education could be more important. When Galton suggested that publishing research could encourage intermarriage within a "caste" of "those who are naturally gifted", Darwin foresaw practical difficulties and thought it "the sole feasible, yet I fear utopian, plan of procedure in improving the human race", preferring to simply publicise the importance of inheritance and leave decisions to individuals. Francis Galton named this field of study "eugenics" in 1883,^{[VIII]} after Darwin's death, and his theories were cited to promote eugenic policies.

== Evolutionary social movements ==
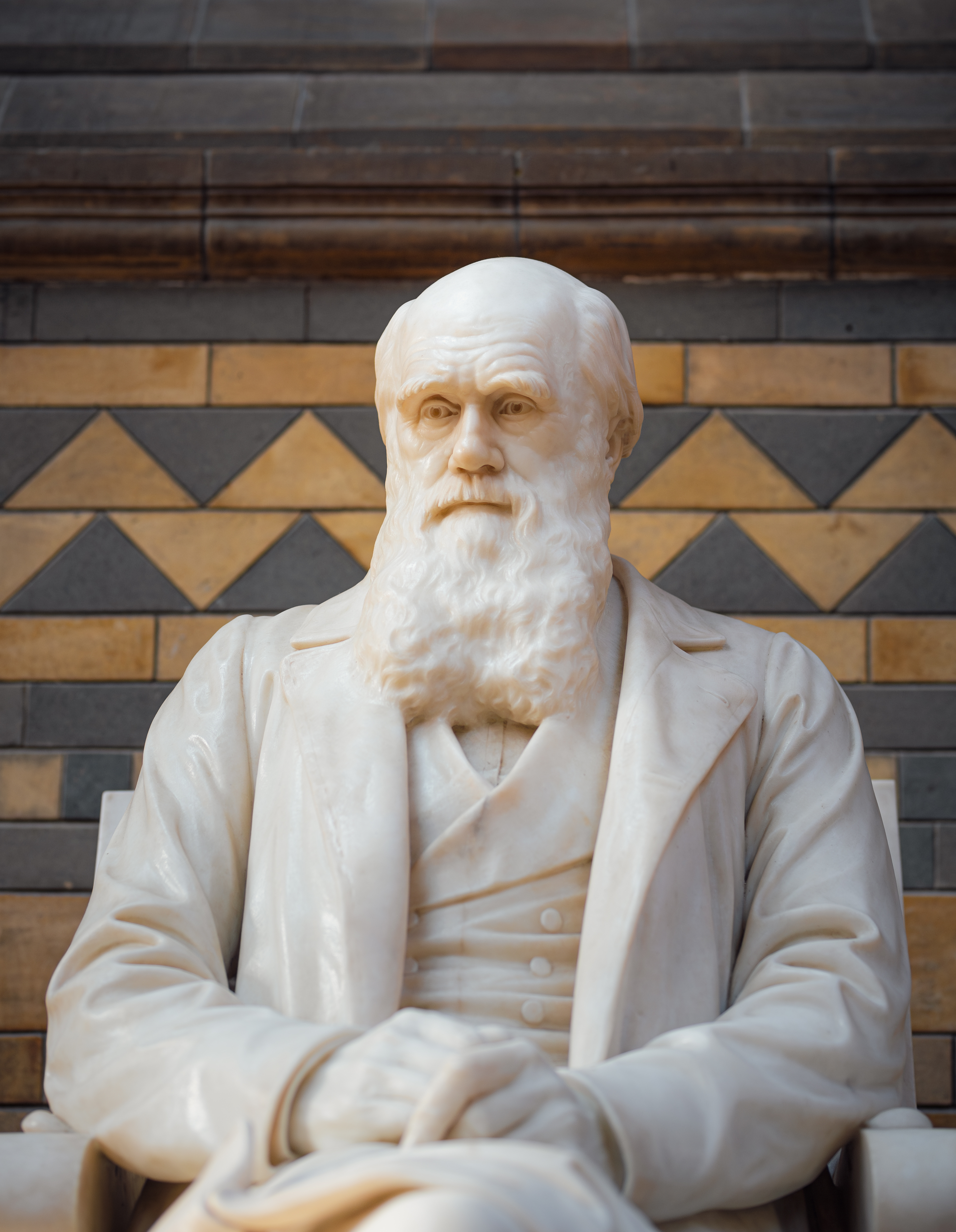
A statue of Darwin in the Natural History Museum, London

Darwin's fame and popularity led to his name being associated with ideas and movements that, at times, had only an indirect relation to his writings, and sometimes went directly against his express comments.

Thomas Malthus had argued that population growth beyond resources was ordained by God to get humans to work productively and show restraint in getting families; this was used in the 1830s to justify workhouses and laissez-faire economics. Evolution was by then seen as having social implications, and Herbert Spencer's 1851 book Social Statics based ideas of human freedom and individual liberties on his Lamarckian evolutionary theory.

Soon after the Origin was published in 1859, critics derided his description of a struggle for existence as a Malthusian justification for the English industrial capitalism of the time. The term Darwinism was used for the evolutionary ideas of others, including Spencer's "survival of the fittest" as free-market progress, and Ernst Haeckel's polygenistic ideas of human development. Writers used natural selection to argue for various, often contradictory, ideologies such as laissez-faire dog-eat-dog capitalism, colonialism, and imperialism. However, Darwin's holistic view of nature included "dependence of one being on another"; thus pacifists, socialists, liberal social reformers and anarchists such as Peter Kropotkin stressed the value of cooperation over struggle within a species. Darwin himself insisted that social policy should not simply be guided by concepts of struggle and selection in nature.

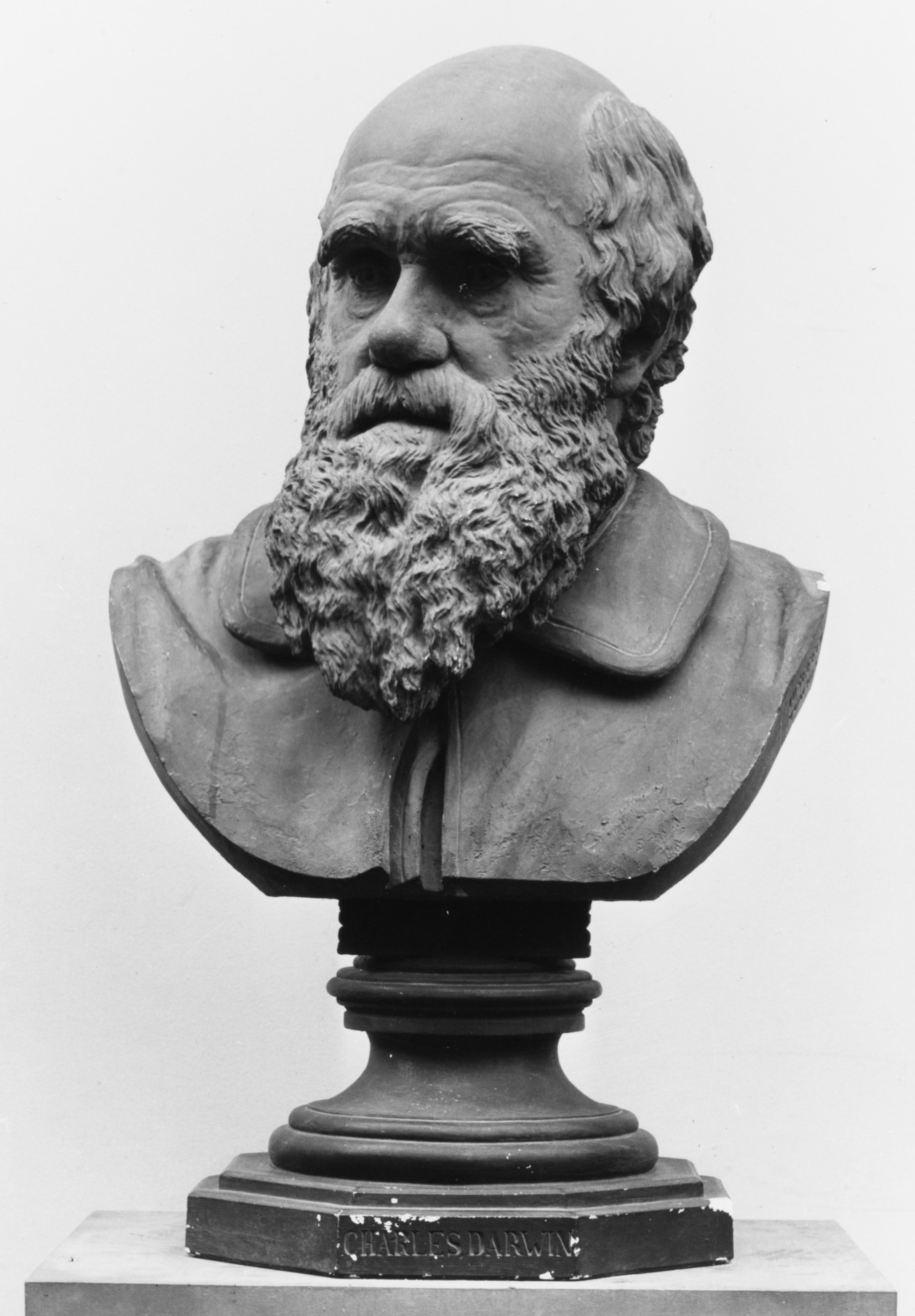
A bust of Darwin by Joseph Echteler

After the 1880s, the eugenics movement developed on ideas of biological inheritance, and for scientific justification of their ideas appealed to some concepts of Darwinism. In Britain, most shared Darwin's cautious views on voluntary improvement and sought to encourage those with good traits in "positive eugenics". During the "Eclipse of Darwinism", a scientific foundation for eugenics was provided by Mendelian genetics. Negative eugenics to remove the "feebleminded" was widely popular across the political spectrum in the United States, Canada, and Australia. Belief in negative eugenics led to the introduction of compulsory sterilisation laws in the United States, followed by several other countries. Subsequently, Nazi eugenics brought the field into disrepute.^{[VII]}

The term "Social Darwinism" was used infrequently from around the 1890s, but became popular as a derogatory term in the 1940s when used by Richard Hofstadter to attack the laissez-faire conservatism of those like William Graham Sumner who opposed reform and socialism. Since then, it has been used as a term of abuse by those opposed to what they think are the moral consequences of evolution.

== Works ==
Darwin was a prolific writer. Even without the publication of his works on evolution, he would have had a considerable reputation as the author of The Voyage of the Beagle, as a geologist who had published extensively on South America and had solved the puzzle of the formation of coral atolls, and as a biologist who had published the definitive work on barnacles. While On the Origin of Species dominates perceptions of his work, The Descent of Man and The Expression of the Emotions in Man and Animals had considerable impact, and his books on plants including The Power of Movement in Plants were innovative studies of great importance, as was his final work on The Formation of Vegetable Mould Through the Action of Worms.

== Legacy and commemoration ==
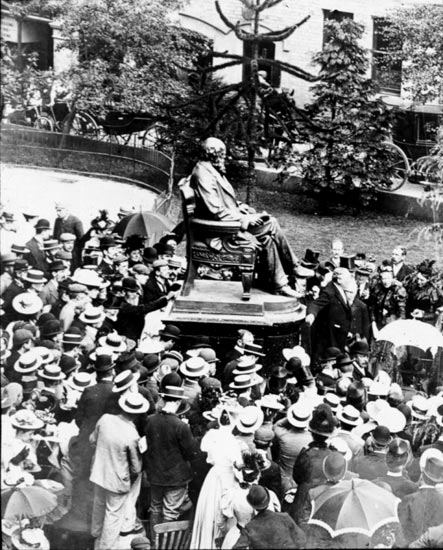
Unveiling in 1897 of the Darwin Statue at the former Shrewsbury School building where he had studied

As Alfred Russel Wallace put it, Darwin had "wrought a greater revolution in human thought within a quarter of a century than any man of our time – or perhaps any time", having "given us a new conception of the world of life, and a theory which is itself a powerful instrument of research; has shown us how to combine into one consistent whole the facts accumulated by all the separate classes of workers, and has thereby revolutionised the whole study of nature". The paleoanthropologist Trenton Holliday states that "Darwin is rightly considered to be the preeminent evolutionary scientist of all time". Ernst Mayr considered On the Origin of Species to be, second to the Bible, the second most important book in history with regards to its influence on human thought, and he considered the scientific revolution that Darwin's theory of evolution ushered in to be "perhaps the most fundamental of all the intellectual revolutions in the history of mankind".

By around 1880, most scientists were convinced of evolution as descent with modification, though few agreed with Darwin that natural selection "has been the main but not the exclusive means of modification". During "the eclipse of Darwinism" scientists explored alternative mechanisms. Then Ronald Fisher incorporated Mendelian genetics in The Genetical Theory of Natural Selection, leading to population genetics and the modern evolutionary synthesis, which continues to develop. Scientific discoveries have confirmed and validated Darwin's key insights. The biologist Theodosius Dobzhansky said that "Nothing in biology makes sense except in the light of evolution."

Geographical features given his name include Darwin Sound and Mount Darwin, both named while he was on the Beagle voyage, and Darwin Harbour, named by his former shipmates on its next voyage, which eventually became the location of Darwin, the capital city of Australia's Northern Territory. Darwin's name was given, formally or informally, to numerous plants and animals, including many he had collected on the voyage.

In 1908, the Linnean Society of London began awards of the Darwin–Wallace Medal, to mark fifty years from the joint reading on 1 July 1858 of papers by Darwin and Wallace publishing their theory. Further awards were made in 1958 and 2008; since 2010, the awards have been annual. Darwin College, a postgraduate college at Cambridge University founded in 1964, is named after the Darwin family. From 2000 to 2017, UK£10 banknotes issued by the Bank of England featured Darwin's portrait printed on the reverse, along with a hummingbird and HMS Beagle. Darwin's bicentennial was celebrated with a series of postage stamps in the United Kingdom.

Darwin's work is noted for its literary merit. Steven Weinberg wrote that On the Origin of Species "is a nearly unique example of a report of professional scientific research of the highest calibre that at the same time is at least implicitly a polemic – as Darwin said, 'one long argument' ... His book works as a polemic in part because it is wonderfully readable." Ian McEwan included The Expression of the Emotions in his canon of science writing, noting "he makes the case for emotions as human universals, shared across cultures. He also makes an anti-racist argument for a common human nature. This is one of the first science books to make use of photographs - in this case, one of the Darwin babies bawling in a high chair."

The Smithsonian National Museum of Natural History has a bronze statue of Charles Darwin in its Deep Time Hall, which features Darwin seated on a bench with a notebook containing his "tree of life" sketch. The statue was sculpted by David Clendining and was installed as the centrepiece of the hall, which focuses on Darwinian evolution.

== See also ==
- 1991 Darwin
- Evolution, PBS documentary
- Creation (biographical drama film)
- Creation–evolution controversy
- European and American voyages of scientific exploration
- History of biology
- History of evolutionary thought
- List of coupled cousins
- List of multiple discoveries
- Multiple discovery
- Portraits of Charles Darwin
- Tinamou egg
- Universal Darwinism

== Notes ==
I. Robert FitzRoy was to become known after the voyage for biblical literalism, but at this time he had considerable interest in Lyell's ideas, and they met before the voyage when Lyell asked for observations to be made in South America. FitzRoy's diary during the ascent of the River Santa Cruz in Patagonia recorded his opinion that the plains were raised beaches, but on return, newly married to a very religious lady, he recanted these ideas.(Browne 1995, pp. 186, 414)

II. In the section "Morphology" of Chapter XIII of On the Origin of Species, Darwin commented on homologous bone patterns between humans and other mammals, writing: "What can be more curious than that the hand of a man, formed for grasping, that of a mole for digging, the leg of the horse, the paddle of the porpoise, and the wing of the bat, should all be constructed on the same pattern, and should include the same bones, in the same relative positions?" and in the concluding chapter: "The framework of bones being the same in the hand of a man, wing of a bat, fin of the porpoise, and leg of the horse … at once explain themselves on the theory of descent with slow and slight successive modifications."

III. ^{1} ^{2} ^{3} In On the Origin of Species Darwin mentioned human origins in his concluding remark that "In the distant future I see open fields for far more important researches. Psychology will be based on a new foundation, that of the necessary acquirement of each mental power and capacity by gradation. Light will be thrown on the origin of man and his history."

In "Chapter VI: Difficulties on Theory" he referred to sexual selection: "I might have adduced for this same purpose the differences between the races of man, which are so strongly marked; I may add that some little light can apparently be thrown on the origin of these differences, chiefly through sexual selection of a particular kind, but without here entering on copious details my reasoning would appear frivolous."

In The Descent of Man of 1871, Darwin discussed the first passage: "During many years I collected notes on the origin or descent of man, without any intention of publishing on the subject, but rather with the determination not to publish, as I thought that I should thus only add to the prejudices against my views. It seemed to me sufficient to indicate, in the first edition of my 'Origin of Species,' that by this work 'light would be thrown on the origin of man and his history;' and this implies that man must be included with other organic beings in any general conclusion respecting his manner of appearance on this earth." In a preface to the 1874 second edition, he added a reference to the second point: "it has been said by several critics, that when I found that many details of structure in man could not be explained through natural selection, I invented sexual selection; I gave, however, a tolerably clear sketch of this principle in the first edition of the 'Origin of Species,' and I there stated that it was applicable to man."

IV. See, for example, WILLA volume 4, Charlotte Perkins Gilman and the Feminization of Education by Deborah M. De Simone: "Gilman shared many basic educational ideas with the generation of thinkers who matured during the period of 'intellectual chaos' caused by Darwin's Origin of the Species. Marked by the belief that individuals can direct human and social evolution, many progressives came to view education as the panacea for advancing social progress and for solving such problems as urbanisation, poverty, or immigration."

V. See, for example, the song "A lady fair of lineage high" from Gilbert and Sullivan's Princess Ida, which describes the descent of man (but not woman!) from apes.

VI. Darwin's belief that black people had the same essential humanity as Europeans, and had many mental similarities, was reinforced by the lessons he had from John Edmonstone in 1826. Early in the Beagle voyage, Darwin nearly lost his position on the ship when he criticised FitzRoy's defence and praise of slavery. (Darwin 1958, p. 74) He wrote home about "how steadily the general feeling, as shown at elections, has been rising against Slavery. What a proud thing for England if she is the first European nation which utterly abolishes it! I was told before leaving England that after living in slave countries all my opinions would be altered; the only alteration I am aware of is forming a much higher estimate of the negro character." (Darwin 1887, p. 246) Regarding Fuegians, he "could not have believed how wide was the difference between savage and civilized man: it is greater than between a wild and domesticated animal, inasmuch as in man there is a greater power of improvement", but he knew and liked civilised Fuegians like Jemmy Button: "It seems yet wonderful to me, when I think over all his many good qualities, that he should have been of the same race, and doubtless partaken of the same character, with the miserable, degraded savages whom we first met here." (Darwin 1845, pp. 205, 207–208)

In the Descent of Man, he mentioned the similarity of Fuegians' and Edmonstone's minds to Europeans' when arguing against "ranking the so-called races of man as distinct species".

He rejected the ill-treatment of native people, and for example wrote of massacres of Patagonian men, women, and children, "Every one here is fully convinced that this is the most just war, because it is against barbarians. Who would believe in this age that such atrocities could be committed in a Christian civilized country?"(Darwin 1845, p. 102)

VII. ^{1} ^{2} Geneticists studied human heredity as Mendelian inheritance, while eugenics movements sought to manage society, with a focus on social class in the United Kingdom, and on disability and ethnicity in the United States, leading to geneticists seeing this movement as impractical pseudoscience. A shift from voluntary arrangements to "negative" eugenics included compulsory sterilisation laws in the United States, copied by Nazi Germany as the basis for Nazi eugenics based on virulent racism and "racial hygiene".
(Thurtle, Phillip (17 December 1996). "the creation of genetic identity". SEHR. Vol. 5, no. Supplement: Cultural and Technological Incubations of Fascism. Archived from the original on 18 February 2008. Edwards, A. W. F. (1 April 2000). "The Genetical Theory of Natural Selection". Genetics. Vol. 154, no. April 2000. pp. 1419–1426. PMC 1461012. PMID 10747041.Wilkins, John. "Evolving Thoughts: Darwin and the Holocaust 3: eugenics". Archived from the original on 5 December 2008.)

VIII. David Quammen writes of his "theory that [Darwin] turned to these arcane botanical studies – producing more than one book that was solidly empirical, discreetly evolutionary, yet a 'horrid bore' – at least partly so that the clamorous controversialists, fighting about apes and angels and souls, would leave him... alone". David Quammen, "The Brilliant Plodder" (review of Ken Thompson, Darwin's Most Wonderful Plants: A Tour of His Botanical Legacy, University of Chicago Press, 255 pp.; Elizabeth Hennessy, On the Backs of Tortoises: Darwin, the Galápagos, and the Fate of an Evolutionary Eden, Yale University Press, 310 pp.; Bill Jenkins, Evolution Before Darwin: Theories of the Transmutation of Species in Edinburgh, 1804–1834, Edinburgh University Press, 222 pp.), The New York Review of Books, vol. LXVII, no. 7 (23 April 2020), pp. 22–24. Quammen, quoted from p. 24 of his review.

== Bibliography ==
- Anonymous (1882). "Obituary: Death of Chas. Darwin". The New York Times. No. 21 April 1882. Archived from the original on 15 October 2009.
- Balfour, J. H. (11 May 1882). "Obituary Notice of Charles Robert Darwin" . Transactions & Proceedings of the Botanical Society of Edinburgh (14): 284–298.
- Bannister, Robert C. (1989). Social Darwinism: Science and Myth in Anglo-American Social Thought. Philadelphia: Temple University Press. ISBN 978-0-87722-566-9.
- Bowler, Peter J. (2003). Evolution: The History of an Idea (3rd ed.). University of California Press. ISBN 978-0-520-23693-6.
- Browne, E. Janet (1995). Charles Darwin: vol. 1 Voyaging. London: Jonathan Cape. ISBN 978-1-84413-314-7.
- Browne, E. Janet (2002). Charles Darwin: vol. 2 The Power of Place. London: Jonathan Cape. ISBN 978-0-7126-6837-8.
- Browne, E. Janet (30 June 2026). Darwin: A Biography. Princeton University Press. ISBN 978-0691232256. Forthcoming one-volume abridgement of 1995 and 2002 books.
- Browne, E. Janet (2006). Darwin's Origin of Species: A Biography. Atlantic. ISBN 9781843543930.
- Darwin, Charles (1 December 1835). Henslow, J S (ed.). [Extracts from letters addressed to Professor Henslow]. Cambridge: [privately printed]. Archived from the original on 4 October 2022.
- Darwin, Charles (1837). Notebook B: (Transmutation of species). Darwin Online. CUL-DAR121. Archived from the original on 8 February 2009.
- Darwin, Charles (1839). Narrative of the surveying voyages of His Majesty's Ships Adventure and Beagle between the years 1826 and 1836, describing their examination of the southern shores of South America, and the Beagle's circumnavigation of the globe. Journal and remarks. 1832–1836. Vol. III. London: Henry Colburn. Archived from the original on 15 August 2012.
- Darwin, Charles (1909). "Pencil Sketch of 1842". In Darwin, Francis (ed.). The foundations of The origin of species: Two essays written in 1842 and 1844. Cambridge University Press. Archived from the original on 29 September 2011.
- Darwin, Charles (1845). Journal of researches into the natural history and geology of the countries visited during the voyage of H.M.S. Beagle round the world, under the Command of Capt. Fitz Roy, R.N. 2d edition. London: John Murray. Archived from the original on 17 September 2011.
- Darwin, Charles (1859). On the Origin of Species by Means of Natural Selection, or the Preservation of Favoured Races in the Struggle for Life (1st ed.). London: John Murray. Archived from the original on 5 October 2008.
- Darwin, Charles (1871). The Descent of Man, and Selection in Relation to Sex (1st ed.). London: John Murray. Archived from the original on 12 July 2011.
- Darwin, Charles (1872). The Origin of Species by Means of Natural Selection, or the Preservation of Favoured Races in the Struggle for Life (6th ed.). London: John Murray. Archived from the original on 7 January 2010.
- Darwin, Charles (1874). The Descent of Man, and Selection in Relation to Sex (2nd ed.). London: John Murray. Archived from the original on 12 July 2011.
- Darwin, Charles (1887). Darwin, Francis (ed.). The life and letters of Charles Darwin, including an autobiographical chapter. London: John Murray. Archived from the original on 5 March 2011.
- Darwin, Charles (1958). Barlow, Nora (ed.). The Autobiography of Charles Darwin 1809–1882. With the original omissions restored. Edited and with appendix and notes by his granddaughter Nora Barlow. London: Collins. Archived from the original on 16 August 2013.
- Darwin, Charles (2006). "Journal". In van Wyhe, John (ed.). Darwin's personal 'Journal' (1809–1881). Darwin Online. CUL-DAR158.1–76. Archived from the original on 24 December 2008.
- Darwin, Charles; Costa, James T. (2009). The Annotated Origin: A Facsimile of the First Edition of On the Origin of Species Annotated by James T. Costa. Cambridge, Massachusetts, and London, England: Belknap Press of Harvard University Press. ISBN 978-0-674-03281-1.
- Desmond, Adrian; Moore, James (1991). Darwin. London: Michael Joseph, Penguin Group. ISBN 978-0-7181-3430-3.
- Desmond, Adrian; Moore, James; Browne, Janet (2004). "Darwin, Charles Robert". Oxford Dictionary of National Biography (online ed.). Oxford, England: Oxford University Press. doi:10.1093/ref:odnb/7176. ISBN 978-0-19-861411-1. (Subscription, Wikipedia Library access or UK public library membership required.)
- Desmond, Adrian; Moore, James; Browne, Janet (2007). Charles Darwin (Very Interesting People). Oxford, England: Oxford University Press. ISBN 978-0-19-921354-2.
- Desmond, Adrian; Moore, James (2009). Darwin's sacred cause: race, slavery and the quest for human origins. London: Allen Lane. ISBN 978-1-84614-035-8.
- Eldredge, Niles (2006). "Confessions of a Darwinist". The Virginia Quarterly Review (Spring 2006): 32–53. Archived from the original on 24 December 2013.
- FitzRoy, Robert (1839). Voyages of the Adventure and Beagle, Volume II. London: Henry Colburn. Archived from the original on 5 May 2011.
- Freeman, R. B. (1977). The Works of Charles Darwin: An Annotated Bibliographical Handlist. Folkestone: Wm Dawson & Sons Ltd. ISBN 978-0-208-01658-4. Archived from the original on 4 October 2022.
- Freeman, R. B. (2007). Charles Darwin: A companion (2nd online ed.). The Complete Works of Charles Darwin Online. pp. 107, 109. Archived from the original on 25 December 2014.
- Herbert, Sandra (1980). "The Red Notebook of Charles Darwin". Bulletin of the British Museum (Natural History), Historical Series. 7 (7 (24 April)): 1–164. doi:10.5962/p.272299. Archived from the original on 11 July 2007.
- Herbert, Sandra (1991). "Charles Darwin as a prospective geological author". British Journal for the History of Science. 24 (2): 159–192. doi:10.1017/S0007087400027060. S2CID 143748414. Archived from the original on 29 March 2017.
- Holliday, Trenton (2021). Cro-Magnon: The Story of the Last Ice Age People of Europe. NewYork: Columbia University Press. ISBN 978-0-231-20497-2.
- Huxley, Julian; Kettlewell, H.B.D. (1965). Charles Darwin and His World. New York: The Viking Press.
- Keynes, Richard (2000). Charles Darwin's zoology notes & specimen lists from H.M.S. Beagle. Cambridge University Press. ISBN 978-0-521-46569-4. Archived from the original on 5 December 2008.
- Keynes, Richard (2001). Charles Darwin's Beagle Diary. Cambridge University Press. ISBN 978-0-521-23503-7.
- Kotzin, Daniel (2004). "Point-Counterpoint: Social Darwinism". Columbia American History Online. Archived from the original on 19 July 2011.
- Larson, Edward J. (2004). Evolution: The Remarkable History of a Scientific Theory. Modern Library. ISBN 978-0-679-64288-6.
- Leff, David (2000). "AboutDarwin.com" (2000–2008 ed.). Archived from the original on 28 August 2013.
- Leifchild (19 November 1859). "Review of 'Origin'". Athenaeum (1673). Archived from the original on 5 December 2008.
- Miles, Sara Joan (2001). "Charles Darwin and Asa Gray Discuss Teleology and Design". Perspectives on Science and Christian Faith. 53: 196–201. Archived from the original on 5 April 2020.
- Moore, James (2005). "Darwin – A 'Devil's Chaplain'?" (PDF). American Public Media. Archived from the original (PDF) on 27 February 2008.
- Moore, James (2006). "Evolution and Wonder – Understanding Charles Darwin". Speaking of Faith (Radio Program). American Public Media. Archived from the original on 22 December 2008.
- Owen, Richard (1840). Darwin, C. R. (ed.). Fossil Mammalia Part 1. The zoology of the voyage of H.M.S. Beagle. London: Smith Elder and Co.
- Paul, Diane B. (2003). "Darwin, social Darwinism and eugenics". In Hodge, Jonathan; Radick, Gregory (eds.). The Cambridge Companion to Darwin. Cambridge University Press. pp. 214–239. ISBN 978-0-521-77730-8.
- Radick, Gregory (2013). "Darwin and Humans". In Ruse, Michael (ed.). The Cambridge Encyclopedia of Darwin and Evolutionary Thought. Cambridge University Press. pp. 173–181.
- Smith, Charles H. (1999). "Alfred Russel Wallace on Spiritualism, Man, and Evolution: An Analytical Essay". Archived from the original on 5 December 2008.
- Sulloway, Frank J. (1982). "Darwin and His Finches: The Evolution of a Legend" (PDF). Journal of the History of Biology. 15 (1): 1–53. doi:10.1007/BF00132004. S2CID 17161535. Archived from the original (PDF) on 16 December 2008.
- Sweet, William (2004). "Herbert Spencer". Internet Encyclopedia of Philosophy. Archived from the original on 28 May 2010.
- Wilkins, John S. (1997). "Evolution and Philosophy: Does evolution make might right?". TalkOrigins Archive. Archived from the original on 14 May 2011.
- Wilkins, John S. (2008). "Darwin". In Tucker, Aviezer (ed.). A Companion to the Philosophy of History and Historiography. Blackwell Companions to Philosophy. Chichester: Wiley-Blackwell. pp. 405–415. ISBN 978-1-4051-4908-2.
- van Wyhe, John (27 March 2007). "Mind the gap: Did Darwin avoid publishing his theory for many years?". Notes and Records of the Royal Society. 61 (2): 177–205. doi:10.1098/rsnr.2006.0171. S2CID 202574857. Archived from the original on 11 January 2011.
- van Wyhe, John (2008). "Charles Darwin: gentleman naturalist: A biographical sketch". Darwin Online. Archived from the original on 13 January 2020.
- van Wyhe, John (2008b). Darwin: The Story of the Man and His Theories of Evolution. London: Andre Deutsch Ltd (published 1 September 2008). ISBN 978-0-233-00251-4.
- von Sydow, Momme (2005). "Darwin – A Christian Undermining Christianity? On Self-Undermining Dynamics of Ideas Between Belief and Science" (PDF). In Knight, David M.; Eddy, Matthew D. (eds.). Science and Beliefs: From Natural Philosophy to Natural Science, 1700–1900. Burlington: Ashgate. pp. 141–156. ISBN 978-0-7546-3996-1. Archived from the original (PDF) on 26 March 2009.
- Yates, Simon (2003). "The Lady Hope Story: A Widespread Falsehood". TalkOrigins Archive. Archived from the original on 12 October 2009.
