= Tinamou egg =

Specimen in Charles Darwin's collection from HMS Beagle voyage

The tinamou egg in Darwin's collection is an egg from the spotted nothura, and is the only specimen left in Darwin's collections during his HMS Beagle voyage. The egg has a large crack because Darwin put it in a box too small for it. It was rediscovered by volunteer Liz Wetton in February 2009, the 200th year of Darwin's birth, while she was sorting the egg collection in the zoology museum at the University of Cambridge.
