= Trenton Holliday =

American paleoanthropologist

Trenton Holliday is a paleoanthropologist who was involved in the discovery of Homo naledi, found in the Dinaledi Chamber of the Rising Star Cave system in South Africa in 2015. Holliday, along with his team, analyzed the body size and proportions of the fossil.

Holliday is a professor and Anthropology Department Chair at Tulane University in New Orleans, Louisiana, where he teaches human evolution, function morphology, and modern human adaptation and variation. He studies the origins of Homo sapiens, origin of the genus Homo, the fate of the Neanderthals, hybridization among extant mammals, and late Australopithecus.

Holliday got his B.A. in anthropology from Louisiana State University (1988) and M.A. (1991) and Ph.D. (1995) in anthropology in the University of New Mexico.

== Selected publications ==
Publication date	Name of publication
July 2023	Cro-Magnon: The Story of the Last Ice Age People of Europe
September 2015	Homo Naledi, a new species of the genus Homo from the Dinaledi Chamber, South Africa
August 2014	Craniofacial Feminization, social Tolerance, and the Origins of Behavioral Modernity
April 2013	The Upper Limb of Australopithecus sediba
December 2012	Body Size, Body Shape, and the Circumscription of the Genus Homo
November 2009	Body proportions of circumpolar people as evidenced from skeletal data: Ipiutak and Tigara (Point Hope) versus Kodiak Island Inuit
January 2008	Evolution at the Crossroads: Modern Human Emergence in Western Asia
December 2003	Species Concepts, Reticulation, and Human Evolution
December 2003	The Origin of Modern Human Behavior
August 2002	Neandertal cold adaptation: Physiological and energetic factors
August 2001	Relative variation in human proximal and distal limb segment lengths
August/October 2000	Activity, Climate, and Postcranial Robusticity
May 1999	Brachial and crural indices of European Late Upper Paleolithic and Mesolithic humans
December 1998	Ecogeographical patterning and stature prediction in fossil hominids: Comment on M.R. Feldesman and R.L. Fountain, American Journal of Physical Anthropology
December 1998	Postcranial evidence of cold adaptation in European Neandertals
May 1997	Body proportions in Late Pleistocene Europe and modern human origins
May 1997	Body mass and encephalization in Pleistocene Homo
September 1996	Morphological affinities of the proximal ulna from Classes River main site: archaic or modern?
August 1995	Lower limb length of European early modern humans in relation to mobility and climate
