= Religious views of Charles Darwin =

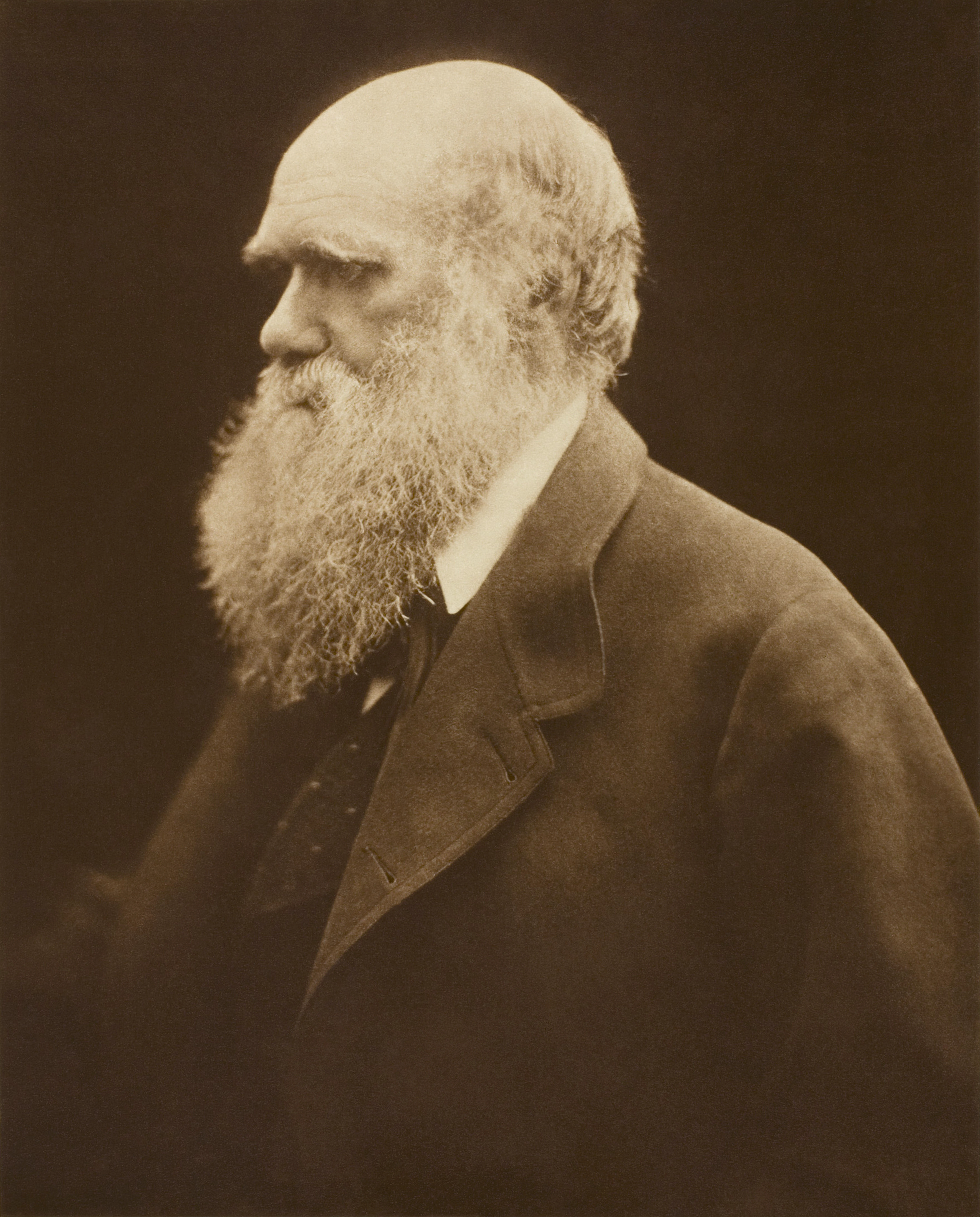
Charles Darwin (1809–1882), who proposed the theory of evolution by means of natural selection

Charles Darwin's views on religion have been the subject of much interest and dispute. His pivotal work in the development of modern biology and evolution theory played a prominent part in debates about religion and science at the time. In the early 20th century his contributions became a focus of the creation–evolution controversy in the United States.

While Darwin came heavily to dispute the dogmatic prescriptions of the Anglican Church and Christianity in general, later in life he clarified his position as an agnostic in response to a letter from John Fordyce: (Note: Fordyce was minister at Spring Church, Grimsby. He included Darwin’s letter to him in his 1883 book Aspects of scepticism (p. 190). Fordyce's original letter is lost, but Darwin's reply and Fordyce's acknowledgement of that are extant.)

In my most extreme fluctuations I have never been an atheist in the sense of denying the existence of a God.— I think that generally (& more and more so as I grow older) but not always, that an agnostic would be the most correct description of my state of mind.

Darwin had a non-conformist Unitarian background, but attended an Anglican school. With the aim of becoming a clergyman, he went to the University of Cambridge for the required Bachelor of Arts degree, which included studies of Anglican theology. He took great interest in natural history and became filled with zeal for science as defined by John Herschel, based on the natural theology of William Paley which presented the argument from divine design in nature to explain adaptation as God acting through laws of nature. On the voyage of the Beagle he remained orthodox and looked for "centres of creation" to explain distribution, but towards the end of the voyage began to doubt that species were fixed. By this time he was critical of the Bible as history, and wondered why all religions should not be equally valid. Following his return in October 1836, he developed his novel ideas of geology while speculating about transmutation of species and thinking about religion.

Following Darwin's marriage to Emma Wedgwood in January 1839, they shared discussions about Christianity for several years, Emma's views being Unitarian like much of her family. The theodicy of Paley and Thomas Robert Malthus vindicated evils such as starvation as a result of a benevolent creator's laws which had an overall good effect. To Darwin, natural selection produced the good of adaptation but removed the need for design, and he could not see the work of an omnipotent deity in all the pain and suffering such as the ichneumon wasp paralysing caterpillars as live food for its eggs. Until 1844 he followed Paley in viewing organisms as perfectly adapted with only a few imperfections, and only partly modified that view by 1859. On the Origin of Species reflects theological views. Though he thought of religion as a tribal survival strategy, Darwin still believed that God was the ultimate lawgiver, and later recollected that at the time he was convinced of the existence of God as a First Cause and deserved to be called a theist. This view subsequently fluctuated, and he continued to explore conscientious doubts, without forming fixed opinions on certain religious matters.

Darwin continued to play a leading part in the parish work of the local church, but from around 1849 would go for a walk on Sundays while his family attended church. Though reticent about his religious views, in 1879 he responded that he had never been an atheist in the sense of denying the existence of a god, and that generally "an Agnostic would be the more correct description of my state of mind." He further stated that "Science has nothing to do with Christ, except insofar as the habit of scientific research makes a man cautious in admitting evidence. For myself, I do not believe that there ever has been any revelation. As for a future life, every man must judge for himself between conflicting vague probabilities."

== Darwin's religious background ==
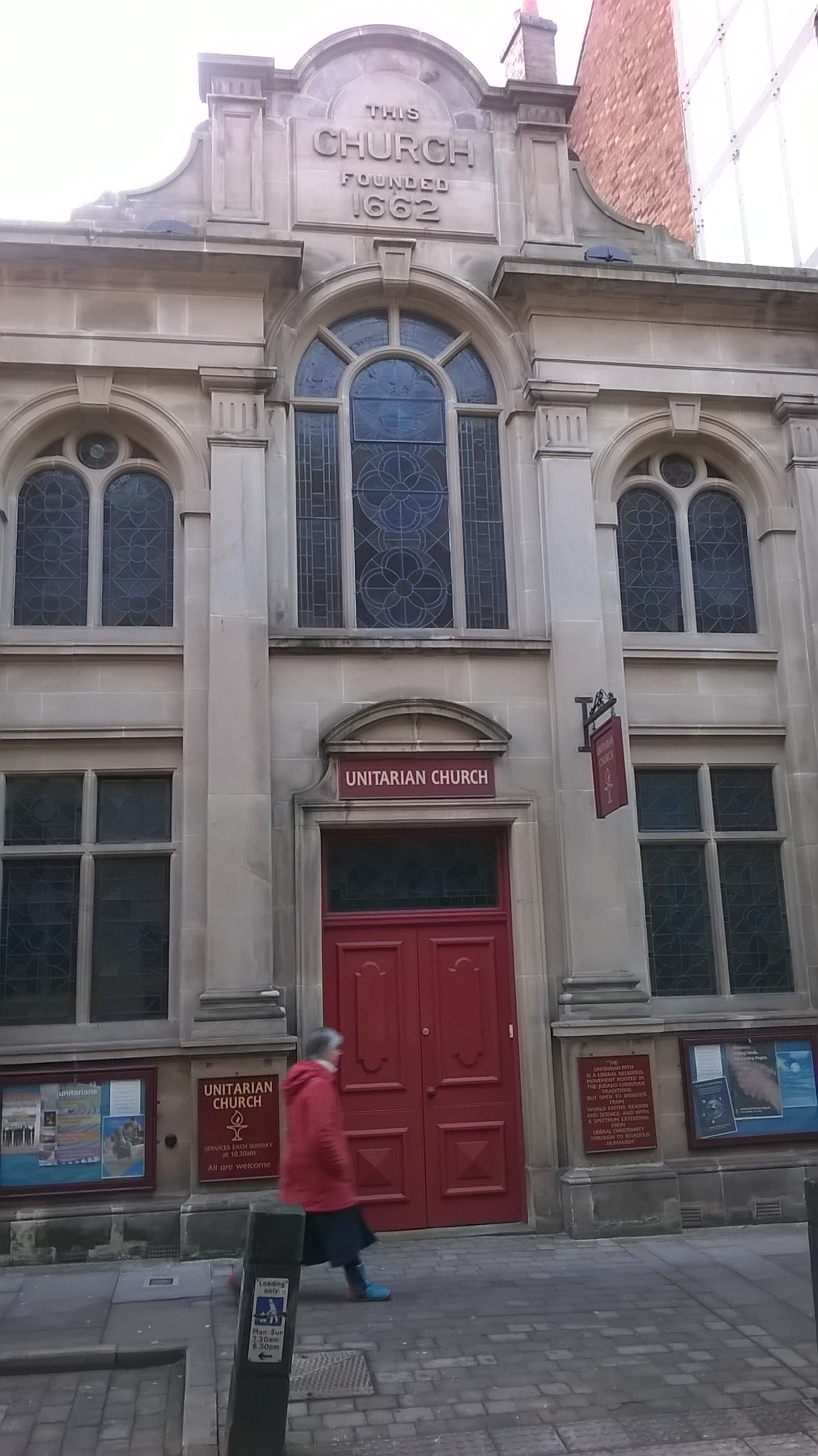
As a child, Darwin attended Shrewsbury Unitarian Church.

Darwin was born during the Napoleonic Wars and grew up in their aftermath, a conservative time when Tory-dominated government closely associated with the established Anglican Church of England repressed Radicalism, but when family memories recalled the 18th-century Enlightenment and a multitude of Non-conformist churches held differing interpretations of Christianity. His Whig-supporting extended family of Darwins and Wedgwoods was strongly Unitarian, though one of his grandfathers, Erasmus Darwin, was a freethinker, and his father was quietly a freethinker but as a physician avoided any social conflict with his wealthy Anglican patrons. While Darwin's parents were open enough to changing social pressures to have Charles baptised in the Church of England, his pious mother took the children to the Unitarian chapel. After her death when he was only eight he became a boarder at Shrewsbury School, an Anglican public school.

=== Edinburgh – medical studies and Lamarckian evolution theory ===
The two universities in England, namely Oxford and Cambridge, were under the Church of England and required students to sign the Thirty-nine Articles of the Anglican faith, so many English Non-conformists sent their children to the Scottish universities which had a better reputation in fields like medicine. Darwin initially attended the University of Edinburgh, and while he was put off medicine he took an active interest in natural history at the Plinian Society. One of his proposers for the society was the radical William A. F. Browne, and on 27 March 1827 Browne argued that mind and consciousness were simply aspects of brain activity, not "souls" or spiritual entities separate from the body. A furious debate ensued, and later someone struck out all mention of this materialist heresy from the minutes. This was the first time that Darwin was exposed to militant freethought and the arguments it aroused. On one occasion Robert Edmond Grant discussed Lamarck's evolutionary ideas. Darwin was astonished, but had recently read the similar ideas of his grandfather Erasmus and remained indifferent.

Natural history had grown from the idea that the different kinds of plants and animals showed the wonder of God's creation, making their study and cataloguing into species worthwhile. In Darwin's day it was common for clergymen to be naturalists, though scientific findings had already opened up ideas on creation. The established churches (of England and Scotland) and the English universities remained insistent that species were divinely created and man was distinct from the "lower orders", but the Unitarian church rejected this teaching and even proclaimed that the human mind was subject to physical law. Erasmus Darwin went further and his Zoönomia asks "…would it be too bold to imagine that all warm-blooded animals have arisen from one living filament, which the great First Cause endued with animality… possessing the faculty of continuing to improve by its own inherent activity, and of delivering down these improvements by generation to its posterity, world without end!", anticipating Lamarckism.

=== Cambridge – theology and geology ===
When Darwin proved unable to persevere at medical studies, his father sent him to Christ's College, Cambridge, for a Bachelor of Arts degree as the first step towards becoming an Anglican parson. Darwin was at first uncertain, he later wrote: "from what little I had heard and thought on the subject I had scruples about declaring my belief in all the dogmas of the Church of England; though otherwise I liked the thought of being a country clergyman. Accordingly I read with care 'Pearson on the Creed' and a few other books on divinity; and as I did not then in the least doubt the strict and literal truth of every word in the Bible, I soon persuaded myself that our Creed must be fully accepted. It never struck me how illogical it was to say that I believed in what I could not understand and what is in fact unintelligible. I might have said with entire truth that I had no wish to dispute any dogma; but I never was such a fool as to feel and say 'credo quia incredibile". He was particularly convinced by the reasoning of John Bird Sumner's Evidences of Christianity which set out the logic that the unbelief of sceptics gave them the dilemma that if Christianity were untrue, then either "Jesus did not live, or he actually lived, but was not the Son of God, hence an imposter." The Gospels made this highly improbable, as his miracles had convinced unbelievers, hence we had "no right to deny" that such events were probable. Jesus's religion was "wonderfully suitable… to our ideas of happiness in this & the next world" and there was "no other way… of explaining the series of evidence & probability."

The university was essentially tied into the Church of England, with virtually all of the college heads and most of the professors and fellows having been ordained. About half of the undergraduates were destined for the church, like Darwin hoping for a comfortable parish. During Darwin's second year, the harmony was disturbed when Cambridge was briefly visited by the Radicals Richard Carlile and the Revd Robert Taylor on an "infidel home missionary tour", causing a stir before being banned. Taylor would be remembered by Darwin as "the Devil's Chaplain", a warning example of an outcast from society who had challenged Christianity and had been imprisoned for blasphemy.

In his third year, he joined John Stevens Henslow's natural history course and was introduced to the Cambridge version of natural theology, part of the liberal Christianity of colleagues such as Adam Sedgwick, George Peacock and William Whewell who all had strong views about science as the search for the laws of nature. Study of nature was study of the work of the Lord, and scientists who were ordained clerics of the Church of England, such as themselves, could follow their enquiries without theological difficulties. Sedgwick gave a talk to the Geological Society of London in 1831 which declared that "No opinion can be heretical, but that which is not true… Conflicting falsehoods we can comprehend; but truths can never war against each other. I affirm, therefore, that we have nothing to fear from the results of our enquiries, provided they be followed in the laborious but secure road of honest induction. In this way we may rest assured that we shall never arrive at conclusions opposed to any truth, either physical or moral, from whatever source that truth may be derived." For these men, science could not be out of harmony with religion, and in a sense it was religion.

Under pressure in the fourth year, Darwin worked hard at his studies, getting tuition in theology by Henslow. Darwin became particularly interested in the Revd William Paley's Evidences of Christianity and Principles of Moral and Political Philosophy, which were set texts. The latter was becoming outdated. It opposed arguments for increased democracy, but saw no divine right of rule for the sovereign or the state, only "expediency". Government could be opposed if grievances outweighed the danger and expense to society. The judgement was "Every man for himself". These ideas had suited the conditions of reasonable rule prevailing when the text was published in 1785, but in 1830 they were dangerous ideas at a time when the French king was deposed by middle class republicans and given refuge in England by the Tory government, and resulting radical street protests demanded suffrage, equality and freedom of religion. Paley's text even supported abolition of the Thirty-nine Articles of the Anglican faith which every student at Cambridge (and Oxford University) was required to sign. Henslow insisted that "he should be grieved if a single word of the Thirty-nine Articles were altered" and emphasised the need to respect authority. Darwin later wrote that he was convinced that he "could have written out the whole of the Evidences with perfect correctness, but not of course in the clear language of Paley. The logic of this book and as I may add of his Natural Theology gave me as much delight as did Euclid."

After doing particularly well in his final exam questions on Paleys' books, Darwin read Paley's Natural Theology which set out to refute David Hume's argument that the teleological argument for "design" by a Creator was merely a human projection onto the forces of nature. Paley saw a rational proof of God's existence in the complexity and perfect adaptation to needs of living beings exquisitely fitted to their places in a happy world, while attacking the evolutionary ideas of Erasmus Darwin as coinciding with atheistic schemes and lacking evidence. Paley's benevolent God acted in nature through uniform and universal laws, not arbitrary miracles or changes of laws, and this use of secondary laws provided a theodicy explaining the problem of evil by separating nature from direct divine action, drawing directly on the ideas of Thomas Malthus. For Paley, a Malthusian "system of natural hostilities" of animals living on prey was strictly connected to the surplus of births keeping the world appropriately stocked as circumstances changed, and poverty showed that the world was in a "state of probation… calculated for the production, exercise, and improvement of moral qualities, with a view to a future state", even where such divine purpose was not obvious. This convinced Charles and encouraged his interest in science. He later wrote "I do not think I hardly ever admired a book more than Paley's Natural Theology: I could almost formerly have said it by heart."

He read John Herschel's new Preliminary Discourse on the Study of Natural Philosophy, learning that nature was governed by laws, and the highest aim of natural philosophy was to understand them through an orderly process of induction, balancing observation and theorising. This exemplified the natural theology that Darwin had learnt in previous years. He also read Alexander von Humboldt's Personal Narrative, and the two books were immensely influential, stirring up in him "a burning zeal to add even the most humble contribution to the noble structure of Natural Science."

=== Voyage of the Beagle ===
Darwin planned a visit to the tropics before settling down as a clergyman, and on Henslow's advice studied geology with Adam Sedgwick, finding about the ancient age of the Earth, then went with him for two weeks surveying strata in Wales. He returned to find that his arrangements had fallen through, but was given the opportunity to join the Beagle survey expedition as a gentleman naturalist and companion to Captain Robert FitzRoy. Before they left England FitzRoy gave Darwin a copy of the first volume of Charles Lyell's Principles of Geology, the subject which would be his primary work.

Darwin was questioning from the outset, and in his first zoology notes he wondered why deep-ocean plankton had been created with so much beauty for little purpose as no one could see them. He saw landforms as supporting Lyell's Uniformitarianism which explained features as the outcome of a gradual process over huge periods of time, and quickly showed a gift for theorising about the geology he was examining. He concluded that the land had indeed risen, and referred to loose rock deposits as "part of the long disputed Diluvium". Around 1825 both Lyell and Sedgwick had supported William Buckland's Catastrophism which postulated diluvialism to reconcile findings with the Biblical account of Noah's Ark, but by 1830 evidence had shown them that the "diluvium" had come from a series of local processes. They still distinguished between diluvial and alluvial deposits, but Sedgwick no longer thought these deposits were connected with Noah's flood by the time he taught Darwin, though the debate continued. Darwin's notes show him increasingly discounting "debacles" to account for such formations. It was only later that glaciation was accepted as the source of these deposits.

Lyell's second volume explained extinctions as a "succession of deaths" due to changed circumstances with new species then being created, but Darwin found giant fossils of extinct mammals with no geological signs of a "diluvial debacle" or environmental change, and so rejected Lyell's explanation in favour of Giovanni Battista Brocchi's idea that species had somehow aged and died out. On the Galápagos Islands he remained convinced by Lyell's idea of species spreading from "centres of creation", and assumed that species had spread from the mainland rather than originating on these geologically recent volcanic islands. He failed to note locations of most of his finds, but fortunately recorded mockingbirds and plant life with more care. In Australia, reflecting on the marsupial kangaroos and potoroos, he thought them so strange that an unbeliever "might exclaim 'Surely two distinct Creators must have been [at] work; their object however has been the same & certainly the end in each case is complete'", yet an antlion he was watching was very similar to its European counterpart. "Now what would the Disbeliever say to this? Would any two workmen ever hit on so beautiful, so simple & yet so artificial a contrivance? It cannot be thought so. – The one hand has surely worked throughout the universe. A Geologist perhaps would suggest, that the periods of Creation have been distinct & remote the one from the other; that the Creator rested in his labor." Darwin was struggling with inconsistencies in these ideas. As they neared the end of the voyage his thoughts about the mockingbirds shook his confidence that species were fixed and that variation was limited.

In Cape Town, South Africa, Darwin and FitzRoy visited John Herschel. On 20 February 1836 Herschel had written to Lyell praising his Principles of Geology as opening a way for bold speculation on "that mystery of mysteries, the replacement of extinct species by others." Herschel thought catastrophic extinction and renewal "an inadequate conception of the Creator", and by analogy with other intermediate causes "the origination of fresh species, could it ever come under our cognizance, would be found to be a natural in contradistinction to a miraculous process". The letter was widely circulated in London, and Darwin remembered the phrase "that mystery of mysteries". Missionaries were being accused of causing racial tension and profiteering, and after the Beagle set to sea on 18 June FitzRoy wrote an open letter to the evangelical South African Christian Recorder on the Moral State of Tahiti incorporating extracts from both his and Darwin's diaries to defend the reputation of missionaries. This was given to a passing ship which took it to Cape Town to become FitzRoy's (and Darwin's) first published work.

FitzRoy too had seen geological features as supporting Lyell's timescale, and on his return to England extracts from his diary stressing the immense age of the Patagonian raised beaches were read to the Royal Geographical Society, but he married a very religious lady and in his Narrative of the voyage added a supplement regretting having "remarked to a friend" that these vast plains "could never have been effected by a forty days' flood", remarks he ascribed to his own "turn of mind and ignorance of scripture" during the voyage.

== Darwin's changing view on faith ==
In his later private autobiography, Darwin wrote of the period from October 1836 to January 1839:

During these two years I was led to think much about religion. Whilst on board the Beagle I was quite orthodox, & I remember being heartily laughed at by several of the officers (though themselves orthodox) for quoting the Bible as an unanswerable authority on some point of morality. I suppose it was the novelty of the argument that amused them. But I had gradually come, by this time, to see that the Old Testament from its manifestly false history of the world, with the Tower of Babel, rainbow as a sign, etc., etc., and from its attributing to God the feelings of a revengeful tyrant, was no more to be trusted than the sacred books of the Hindoos, or the beliefs of any barbarian.

In seeking to explain his observations, by early 1837 Darwin was speculating in his notebooks on transmutation of species and writing of "my theory". His journal for 1838 records "All September read a good deal on many subject: thought much upon religion. Beginning of October ditto." At this time he outlined ideas of comparative anthropology, from his knowledge of different religious beliefs around the world as well as at various times in history, and came to the view that scriptures were unreliable and contradictory.

=== Discussions with Emma ===
Having decided to marry, Darwin visited his cousin Emma on 29 July 1838 and told her of his ideas on transmutation. On 11 November, he returned and proposed to Emma. Again he discussed his ideas, and about ten days later she wrote:

When I am with you I think all melancholy thoughts keep out of my head but since you are gone some sad ones have forced themselves in, of fear that our opinions on the most important subject should differ widely. My reason tells me that honest & conscientious doubts cannot be a sin, but I feel it would be a painful void between us. I thank you from my heart for your openness with me & I should dread the feeling that you were concealing your opinions from the fear of giving me pain. It is perhaps foolish of me to say this much but my own dear Charley we now do belong to each other & I cannot help being open with you. Will you do me a favour? yes I am sure you will, it is to read our Saviours farewell discourse to his disciples which begins at the end of the 13th Chap of John. It is so full of love to them & devotion & every beautiful feeling. It is the part of the New Testament I love best. This is a whim of mine it would give me great pleasure, though I can hardly tell why I don't wish you to give me your opinion about it.

Darwin had already wondered about the materialism implied by his ideas, noting in his transmutation notebook "Thought (or desires more properly) being hereditary it is difficult to imagine it anything but structure of brain hereditary, analogy points out to this. – love of the deity effect of organization, oh you materialist!" The letter shows Emma's tension between her fears that differences of belief would separate them, and her desire to be close and openly share ideas. Emma cherished a belief in the afterlife, and was concerned that they should "belong to each other" for eternity. The Gospel of John says "Love one another" (13:34), then describes Jesus as the Word Incarnate saying "I am the way, the truth and the life: no man comes to the Father, except through me." (14:6). Desmond and Moore note that the section continues "Whoever does not abide in me is thrown away like a branch and withers; such branches are gathered, thrown into the fire and burned"(15:6). As disbelief later gradually crept over Darwin, he could "hardly see how anyone ought to wish Christianity to be true; for if so the plain language of the text seems to show that the men who do not believe, and this would include my Father, Brother and almost all my best friends, will be everlastingly punished. And this is a damnable doctrine."

Following Darwin's marriage to Emma Wedgwood in January 1839, they shared discussions about Christianity for many years. Unitarianism emphasised inner feeling which overrode the authority of religious texts or doctrine, and her beliefs resulted from intensive study and questioning. They socialised with the Unitarian clergymen James Martineau and John James Tayler, and read their works as well as those of other Unitarian and liberal Anglican authors such as Francis William Newman, whose Phases of faith described a spiritual journey from Calvinism to theism, all part of widespread and heated debate on the authority of Anglicanism. In Downe Emma attended the Anglican village church, but as a Unitarian had the family turn round in silence when the Trinitarian Nicene Creed was recited.

Soon after their marriage, Emma, while writing about Darwin, felt that "while you [Charles] are acting conscientiously & sincerely wishing, & trying to learn the truth, you cannot be wrong", and though concerned at the threat to faith of the "habit in scientific pursuits of believing nothing till it is proved", Emma’s hope that he did not "consider his opinion as formed" proved correct. Methodical conscientious doubt as a state of inquiry rather than disbelief made him open to nature and revelation, and they remained open with each other.

=== Theorising ===
Darwin was interested in ideas of Natural "laws of harmony", and made enquiries into animal breeding. Having read the new 6th edition of the Revd. Thomas Malthus's Essay on the Principle of Population, around late November 1838 he compared breeders selecting traits to a Malthusian Nature selecting from variants thrown up by chance so that "every part of newly acquired structure is fully practical & perfected", thinking this "a beautiful part of my theory". The theodicy of Paley and Thomas Malthus vindicated evils such as starvation as a result of a benevolent creator's laws which had an overall good effect. To Darwin, natural selection produced the good of adaptation but removed the need for design, and he could not see the work of an omnipotent deity in all the pain and suffering such as the ichneumon wasp paralysing caterpillars as live food for its eggs.

Early in 1842, Darwin wrote about his ideas to Lyell, who noted that his ally "denies seeing a beginning to each crop of species". On 11 January 1844 Darwin mentioned his theorising to the botanist Joseph Dalton Hooker, writing with melodramatic humour "I am almost convinced (quite contrary to opinion I started with) that species are not (it is like confessing a murder) immutable. Heaven forfend me from Lamarck nonsense of a 'tendency to progression' 'adaptations from the slow willing of animals' &c,—but the conclusions I am led to are not widely different from his—though the means of change are wholly so—I think I have found out (here's presumption!) the simple way by which species become exquisitely adapted to various ends." Hooker replied "There may in my opinion have been a series of productions on different spots, & also a gradual change of species. I shall be delighted to hear how you think that this change may have taken place, as no presently conceived opinions satisfy me on the subject."

In November 1844 public controversy erupted over ideas of evolutionary progress in the anonymously published Vestiges of the Natural History of Creation, a well written best-seller which widened public interest in transmutation. Darwin scorned its amateurish geology and zoology, but carefully reviewed his own arguments.

From around 1849 Darwin stopped attending church, but Emma and the children continued to attend services. On Sundays Darwin sometimes went with them as far as the lych gate to the churchyard, and then he would go for a walk. During the service, Emma continued to face forward when the congregation turned to face the altar for the Creed, sticking to her Unitarian faith.

=== Death of Annie ===
At the end of June 1850 his bright nine-year-old daughter Annie who had become a particular favourite and comfort to him fell sick and, after a painful illness, died on 23 April 1851. During Annie's long illness Darwin had read books by Francis William Newman, a Unitarian evolutionist who called for a new post-Christian synthesis and wrote that "the fretfulness of a child is an infinite evil". Darwin wrote at the time, "Our only consolation is that she passed a short, though joyous life." For three years he had deliberated about the Christian meaning of mortality. This opened a new vision of tragically circumstantial nature. His faith in Christianity had already dwindled away and he had stopped going to church. He wrote out his memories of Annie, but no longer believed in an afterlife or in salvation. Emma believed that Annie had gone to heaven and told this to the children, with the unfortunate result that Henrietta wondered, "If all the angels were men, did women go to heaven?" She worried for months that her naughtiness while Annie was alive would mean that she would go to hell unless God forgave her.

=== On the Origin of Species ===
Darwin continued to avoid public controversy and to accumulate evidence supporting his theory against the anticipated arguments. In 1858 the information that Alfred Russel Wallace now had a similar theory forced an early joint publication of Darwin's theory. The reaction to Darwin's theory, even after publication of On the Origin of Species in 1859, was more muted than he had feared. One of the first responses to review copies came from Charles Kingsley, a Christian socialist country rector and novelist, who wrote that it was "just as noble a conception of Deity, to believe that He created primal forms capable of self development... as to believe that He required a fresh act of intervention to supply the lacunas which He Himself had made." For the second edition, Darwin added these lines to the last chapter, with attribution to "a celebrated author and divine".

In 1860 seven liberal Anglican theologians caused a much greater furore by publishing a manifesto titled Essays and Reviews in which they sought to make textual criticism of the Bible available to the ordinary reader, as well as supporting Darwin. Their new "higher criticism" represented "the triumph of the rational discourse of logos over myth." It argued that the Bible should not be read in an entirely literal manner, thus and would in the future become "a bogey of Christian fundamentalists ... but this was only because Western people had lost the original sense of the mythical." The traditional Christians were just as vocal.

There was close correspondence between Darwin and his American collaborator Asa Gray, a devout Presbyterian who discussed with him the relationship of natural selection to natural theology and published several reviews arguing in detail that they were fully compatible. Darwin financed a pamphlet publishing a collection of these reviews for distribution in Britain. In one 1860 letter to Gray, Darwin expressed his doubts about the teleological argument which claimed nature as evidence of god, though he was still inclined to vaguely believe in an impersonal God as first cause:

With respect to the theological view of the question; this is always painful to me.— I am bewildered.– I had no intention to write atheistically. But I own that I cannot see, as plainly as others do, & as I [should] wish to do, evidence of design & beneficence on all sides of us. There seems to me too much misery in the world. I cannot persuade myself that a beneficent & omnipotent God would have designedly created the Ichneumonidæ with the express intention of their feeding within the living bodies of caterpillars, or that a cat should play with mice. Not believing this, I see no necessity in the belief that the eye was expressly designed. On the other hand I cannot anyhow be contented to view this wonderful universe & especially the nature of man, & to conclude that everything is the result of brute force. I am inclined to look at everything as resulting from designed laws, with the details, whether good or bad, left to the working out of what we may call chance. Not that this notion at all satisfies me. I feel most deeply that the whole subject is too profound for the human intellect. A dog might as well speculate on the mind of Newton.— Let each man hope & believe what he can.

=== Autobiography on gradually increasing disbelief ===
In his autobiography written in 1876 Darwin reviewed questions about Christianity in relation to other religions and how "the more we know of the fixed laws of nature the more incredible do miracles become". Though "very unwilling to give up my belief", he found that "disbelief crept over me at a very slow rate, but was at last complete. The rate was so slow that I felt no distress, and have never since doubted even for a single second that my conclusion was correct." He noted how "The old argument of design in nature, as given by Paley, which formerly seemed to me so conclusive, fails, now that the law of natural selection has been discovered", and how Paley's teleological argument had difficulties with the problem of evil.

Even when writing On the Origin of Species in the 1850s he was still inclined to theism, but his views gradually changed to agnosticism:

Another source of conviction in the existence of God, connected with the reason and not with the feelings, impresses me as having much more weight. This follows from the extreme difficulty or rather impossibility of conceiving this immense and wonderful universe, including man with his capacity of looking far backwards and far into futurity, as the result of blind chance or necessity. When thus reflecting I feel compelled to look to a First Cause having an intelligent mind in some degree analogous to that of man; and I deserve to be called a Theist.

This conclusion was strong in my mind about the time, as far as I can remember, when I wrote the Origin of Species; and it is since that time that it has very gradually with many fluctuations become weaker. But then arises the doubt–can the mind of man, which has, as I fully believe, been developed from a mind as low as that possessed by the lowest animal, be trusted when it draws such grand conclusions? May not these be the result of the connection between cause and effect which strikes us as a necessary one, but probably depends merely on inherited experience? Nor must we overlook the probability of the constant inculcation in a belief in God on the minds of children producing so strong and perhaps an inherited effect on their brains not yet fully developed, that it would be as difficult for them to throw off their belief in God, as for a monkey to throw off its instinctive fear and hatred of a snake.

I cannot pretend to throw the least light on such abstruse problems. The mystery of the beginning of all things is insoluble by us; and I for one must be content to remain an Agnostic.

== Downe parish ==
Although he is commonly portrayed as being in conflict with the Church of England, Darwin was supportive of the local parish church.

On moving to Downe, Kent, in 1842, Darwin supported the parish church's work, and became a good friend of the Revd John Brodie Innes, who took over in 1846. Darwin contributed to the church, helped with parish assistance and proposed a benefit society which became the Down Friendly Society with Darwin as guardian and treasurer. His wife Emma Darwin became known throughout the parish for helping in the way a parson's wife might be expected to, and as well as providing nursing care for her own family's frequent illnesses she gave out bread tokens to the hungry and "small pensions for the old, dainties for the ailing, and medical comforts and simple medicine".

Innes inherited his family home of Milton Brodie, in the Scottish Highlands near Forres. In 1862 he retired there and changed his name to Brodie Innes, leaving the parish in the dubious hands of his curate, the Revd. Stevens, while still remaining the patron. The meagre "living" and lack of a vicarage made it hard to attract a priest of quality. Innes made Darwin treasurer of Downe village school and they continued to correspond, with Innes seeking help and advice on parish matters. The Revd. Stevens proved lax, and departed in 1867. His successors were worse, one absconding with the school's funds and the church organ fund after Darwin mistakenly shared the treasurer's duties with him: Brodie Innes offered to sell the advowson – the right to appoint the parish priest – to Darwin but Darwin declined. The next was rumoured to have disgraced himself by "walking with girls at night". Darwin now became involved in helping Innes with detective work, subsequently advising him that the gossip that had reached Innes was not backed up by any reliable evidence.

A new reforming High Church vicar, the Revd. George Sketchley Ffinden, took over the parish in November 1871 and began imposing his ideas. Darwin had to write to Brodie Innes, explaining what had upset the parishioners. Ffinden now usurped control of the village school which had been run for years by a committee of Darwin, Lubbock and the incumbent priest, with a "conscience clause" which protected the children from Anglican indoctrination. Ffinden began lessons on the Thirty-nine Articles of the Anglican faith, an unwelcome move from the point of view of the Baptists who had a chapel in the village. Darwin withdrew from the committee and cut his annual donation to the church, but continued with the Friendly Society work.

For two years Emma organised a winter reading room in the local school for local labourers, who subscribed a penny a week to smoke and play games, with "Respectable newspapers & a few books ... & a respectable housekeeper ... there every evening to maintain decorum." This was a common facility to save men from "resorting to the public house". In 1873 the Revd. Ffinden opposed it, as "Coffee drinking, bagatelle & other games" had been allowed and "the effects of tobacco smoke & spitting" were seen when the children returned in the morning. Emma got Darwin to get the approval of the education inspectorate in London, and just before Christmas 1873 the Darwins and their neighbours the Lubbocks got the agreement of the school committee, offering to pay for any repairs needed "to afford every possible opportunity to the working class for self improvement & amusement". A furious Ffinden huffed that it was "quite out of order" for the Darwins to have gone to the inspectorate behind his back. Darwin's health suffered as he argued over natural selection with St George Jackson Mivart, and in the autumn of 1874 Darwin expressed his exasperation at Ffinden when putting in his resignation from the school committee due to ill health.

Ffinden then refused to speak to any of the Darwins, and when two evening lectures were proposed for the village in 1875, Lubbock had to act as an intermediary in requesting use of the schoolroom. The committee agreed, but Ffinden refused to co-operate, writing that:

I had long been aware of the harmful tendencies to revealed religion of Mr. Darwin's views, but ... I had fully determined ... not to let my difference of opinion interfere with a friendly feeling as neighbours, trusting that God's grace might in time bring one so highly gifted intellectually and morally to a better mind.

Darwin was equally haughty in return, condescending that "If Mr. F. bows to Mrs. D. and myself, we will return it".

The dispute with Ffinden reflected the Church of England narrowing its social provision to its own adherents as secular provision of education became more widespread. Though Darwin no longer attended church, he was willing to give patronage to Non-conformism, and the family welcomed and supported the work of the Non-conformist evangelist J. W. C. Fegan in the village of Downe.

== Religion as an evolved social characteristic ==
In his 1871 book The Descent of Man Darwin clearly saw religion and "moral qualities" as being important evolved human social characteristics. Darwin's frequent pairing of "Belief in God" and religion with topics on superstitions and fetishism throughout the book can also be interpreted as indicating how much truth he assigned to the former.

In the introduction Darwin wrote:

Ignorance more frequently begets confidence than does knowledge: it is those who know little, and not those who know much, who so positively assert that this or that problem will never be solved by science.

Later on in the book he dismisses an argument for religion being innate:

Belief in God — Religion. — There is no evidence that man was aboriginally endowed with the ennobling belief in the existence of an Omnipotent God. On the contrary there is ample evidence, derived not from hasty travellers, but from men who have long resided with savages, that numerous races have existed, and still exist, who have no idea of one or more gods, and who have no words in their languages to express such an idea. The question is of course wholly distinct from that higher one, whether there exists a Creator and Ruler of the universe; and this has been answered in the affirmative by some of the highest intellects that have ever existed.

The belief in God has often been advanced as not only the greatest, but the most complete of all the distinctions between man and the lower animals. It is however impossible, as we have seen, to maintain that this belief is innate or instinctive in man. On the other hand a belief in all-pervading spiritual agencies seems to be universal; and apparently follows from a considerable advance in man's reason, and from a still greater advance in his faculties of imagination, curiosity and wonder. I am aware that the assumed instinctive belief in God has been used by many persons as an argument for His existence. But this is a rash argument, as we should thus be compelled to believe in the existence of many cruel and malignant spirits, only a little more powerful than man; for the belief in them is far more general than in a beneficent Deity. The idea of a universal and beneficent Creator does not seem to arise in the mind of man, until he has been elevated by long-continued culture.

== Enquiries about religious views ==
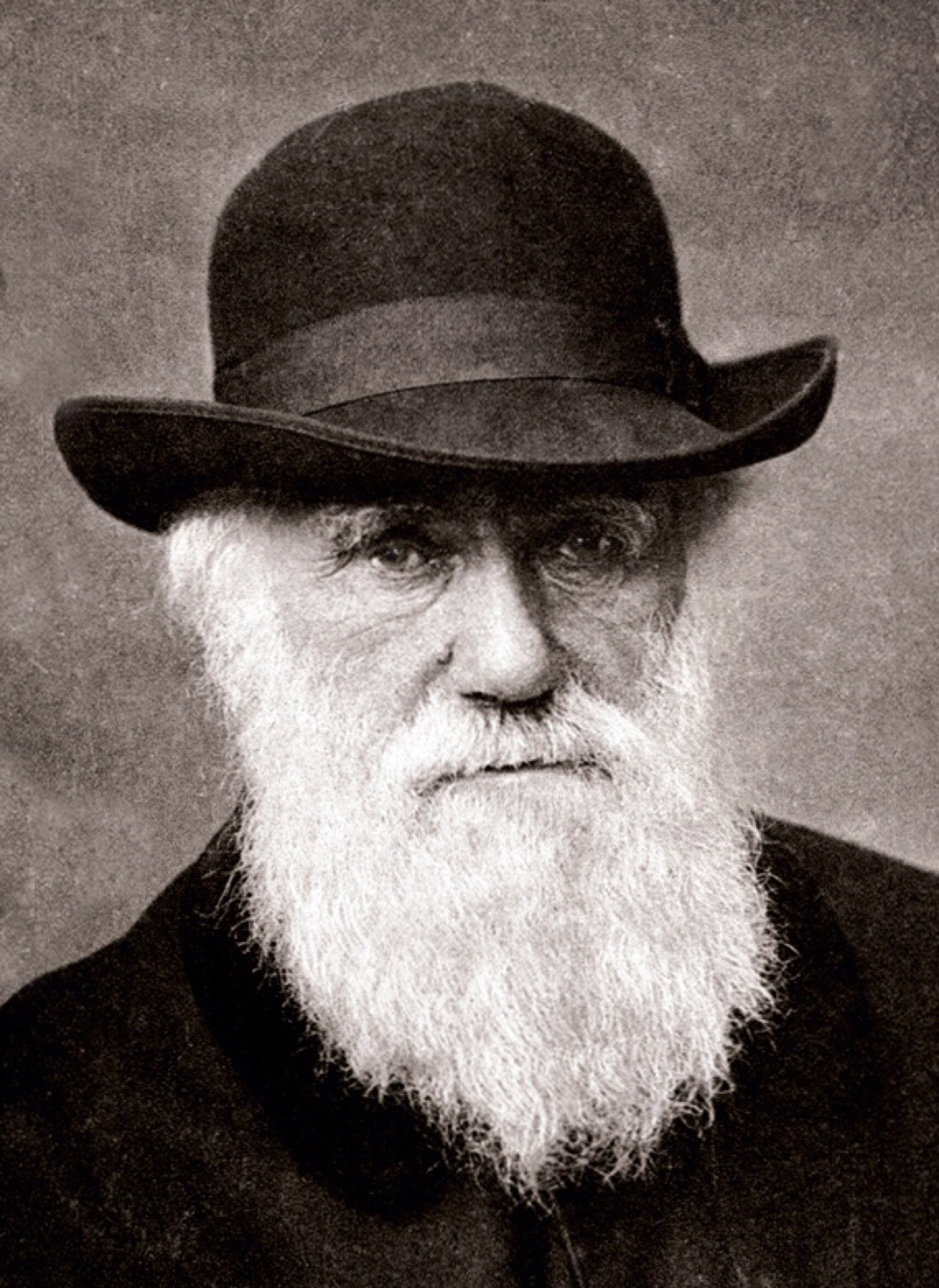
The classic image of Darwin as an old man

Fame and honours brought a stream of enquiries about Darwin's religious views, leading him to comment "Half the fools throughout Europe write to ask me the stupidest questions." He sometimes retorted sharply, "I am sorry to have to inform you that I do not believe in the Bible as a divine revelation, & therefore not in Jesus Christ as the Son of God", and at other times was more guarded, telling a young count studying with Ernst Haeckel that "Science has nothing to do with Christ; except in so far as the habit of scientific research makes a man cautious in admitting evidence. For myself I do not believe that there ever has been any Revelation. As for a future life, every man must judge for himself between conflicting vague probabilities." He declined a request by the Archbishop of Canterbury to join a 'Private Conference' of devout scientists to harmonise science and religion, for he saw "no prospect of any benefit arising" from it.

When Brodie Innes sent on a sermon by E. B. Pusey, Darwin responded that he could "hardly see how religion & science can be kept as distinct as he desires, as geology has to treat of the history of the Earth & Biology that of man.— But I most wholly agree with you that there is no reason why the disciples of either school should attack each other with bitterness, though each upholding strictly their beliefs. You, I am sure, have always practically acted in this manner in your conduct towards me & I do not doubt to all others. Nor can I remember that I have ever published a word directly against religion or the clergy." In response to an enquiry about the same sermon from the botanist Henry Nicholas Ridley, Darwin stated that "Dr Pusey was mistaken in imagining that I wrote the Origin with any relation whatever to Theology", and added that "many years ago when I was collecting facts for the Origin, my belief in what is called a personal God was as firm as that of Dr Pusey himself, & as to the eternity of matter I have never troubled myself about such insoluble questions.— Dr Pusey's attack will be as powerless to retard by a day the belief in evolution as were the virulent attacks made by divines fifty years ago against Geology, & the still older ones of the Catholic church against Galileo". Brodie Innes deplored "unwise and violent" theological attacks on his old friend, for while they had disagreements, "How nicely things would go if other folk were like Darwin and Brodie Innes."

In a letter to a correspondent at the University of Utrecht in 1873, Darwin expressed agnosticism:

I may say that the impossibility of conceiving that this grand and wondrous universe, with our conscious selves, arose through chance, seems to me the chief argument for the existence of God; but whether this is an argument of real value, I have never been able to decide. I am aware that if we admit a first cause, the mind still craves to know whence it came from and how it arose. Nor can I overlook the difficulty from the immense amount of suffering through the world. I am, also, induced to defer to a certain extent to the judgment of many able men who have fully believed in God; but here again I see how poor an argument this is. The safest conclusion seems to me to be that the whole subject is beyond the scope of man's intellect; but man can do his duty.

=== Caution about publication, spiritualism ===
In 1873 Darwin's son George wrote an essay which boldly dismissed prayer, divine morals and "future rewards & punishments". Darwin wrote "I would urge you not to publish it for some months, at the soonest, & then consider whether you think it new & important enough to counterbalance the evils; remembering the cart-loads which have been published on this subject. – The evils on giving pain to others, & injuring your own power & usefulness ... It is an old doctrine of mine that it is of foremost importance for a young author to publish ... only what is very good & new ... remember that an enemy might ask who is this man ... that he should give to the world his opinions on the deepest subjects? ... but my advice is to pause, pause, pause."

During the public interest in Modern Spiritualism, Darwin attended a séance at his elder brother Erasmus Alvey Darwin's house in January 1874, but as the room grew stuffy Darwin went upstairs to lie down, missing the show, with sparks, sounds and the table rising above their heads. While Francis Galton thought it a "good séance", Darwin later wrote "The Lord have mercy on us all, if we have to believe such rubbish" and told Emma that it was "all imposture" and "it would take an enormous weight of evidence" to convince him otherwise. At a second séance Huxley and George found that the medium was nothing but a cheat, to Darwin's relief.

In 1876 Darwin wrote the following regarding his publicly stated position of agnosticism:

Formerly I was led ... to the firm conviction of the existence of God and the immortality of the soul. In my Journal I wrote that whilst standing in the midst of the grandeur of a Brazilian forest, it is not possible to give an adequate idea of the higher feelings of wonder, admiration, and devotion, which fill and elevate the mind. I well remember my conviction that there is more in man than the mere breath of his body. But now, the grandest scenes would not cause any such convictions and feelings to rise in my mind.

In November 1878 when George Romanes presented his new book refuting theism, A Candid Examination of Theism by "Physicus", Darwin read it with "very great interest", but found it unconvincing; the arguments it put forward left open the possibility that God had initially created matter and energy with the potential of evolving to become organised.

=== Agnosticism ===
In 1879 John Fordyce wrote asking if Darwin believed in God, and if theism and evolution were compatible. Darwin replied that "a man may be an ardent Theist and an evolutionist", citing Charles Kingsley and Asa Gray as examples, and for himself, "In my most extreme fluctuations I have never been an atheist in the sense of denying the existence of a God.— I think that generally (& more and more so as I grow older) but not always, that an agnostic would be the most correct description of my state of mind."

Those opposing religion often took Darwin as their inspiration and expected his support for their cause, a role he firmly refused. In 1880 there was a huge controversy when the atheist Charles Bradlaugh was elected as a member of Parliament and then prevented from taking his seat in the House of Commons. In response, the secularist Edward Aveling toured the country leading protests. In October of that year Aveling wanted to dedicate his book on Darwin and his Works to Darwin and asked him for permission. Darwin declined, writing that "though I am a strong advocate for free thought on all subjects, yet it appears to me (whether rightly or wrongly) that direct arguments against Christianity & theism produce hardly any effect on the public; & freedom of thought is best promoted by the gradual illumination of men's minds, which follows from the advance of science. It has, therefore, been always my object to avoid writing on religion, & I have confined myself to science. I may, however, have been unduly biased by the pain which it would give some members of my family, if I aided in any way direct attacks on religion."

==== Aveling and Büchner ====
In Germany militant Darwinismus elevated Darwin to heroic status. When the eminent Freethinker Doctor Ludwig Büchner requested an audience he thought he was greeting a noble ally. To Darwin this was a grotesque misunderstanding, but he felt unable to refuse. Darwin's wife Emma Darwin expressed her expectation that their guest "will refrain from airing his very strong religious opinions" and invited their old friend Innes. On Thursday 28 September 1881 Büchner arrived with Edward Aveling. Darwin's son Frank was also present. Darwin wittily explained that "[Brodie] & I have been fast friends for 30 years. We never thoroughly agreed on any subject but once and then we looked at each other and thought one of us must be very ill."

In uncharacteristically bold discussions after dinner Darwin asked his guests "Why do you call yourselves Atheists?" When they responded that they "did not commit the folly of god-denial, [and] avoided with equal care the folly of god-assertion", Darwin gave a thoughtful response, concluding that "I am with you in thought, but I should prefer the word Agnostic to the word Atheist." Aveling replied that, "after all, 'Agnostic' was but 'Atheist' writ respectable, and 'Atheist' was only 'Agnostic' writ aggressive." Darwin smiled and responded "Why should you be so aggressive? Is anything gained by trying to force these new ideas upon the mass of mankind? It is all very well for educated, cultured, thoughtful people; but are the masses yet ripe for it?" Aveling and Büchner questioned what would have happened if Darwin had been given that advice before publication of the Origin, and had confined "the revolutionary truths of Natural and Sexual Selection to the judicious few", where would the world be? Many feared danger if new ideas were "proclaimed abroad on the house-tops, and discussed in market-place and home. But he, happily for humanity, had by the gentle, irresistible power of reason, forced his new ideas upon the mass of the people. And the masses had been found ripe for it. Had he kept silence, the tremendous strides taken by human thought during the last twenty-one years would have been shorn of their fair proportions, perhaps had hardly been made at all. His own illustrious example was encouragement, was for a command to every thinker to make known to all his fellows that which he believed to be the truth."

Their talk turned to religion, and Darwin said "I never gave up Christianity until I was forty years of age." He agreed that Christianity was "not supported by the evidence", but he had reached this conclusion only slowly. Aveling recorded this discussion, and published it in 1883 as a penny pamphlet. Francis Darwin thought it gave "quite fairly his impressions of my father's views", but took issue with any suggestion of similar religious views, saying "My father's replies implied his preference for the unaggressive attitude of an Agnostic. Dr. Aveling seems to regard the absence of aggressiveness in my father's views as distinguishing them in an unessential manner from his own. But, in my judgment, it is precisely differences of this kind which distinguish him so completely from the class of thinkers to which Dr. Aveling belongs."

== Funeral ==
Darwin's Westminster Abbey funeral expressed a public feeling of national pride, and religious writers of all persuasions praised his "noble character and his ardent pursuit of truth", calling him a "true Christian gentleman". In particular the Unitarians and free religionists, proud of his Dissenting upbringing, supported his naturalistic views. The Unitarian William Carpenter carried a resolution praising Darwin's unravelling of "the immutable laws of the Divine Government", shedding light on "the progress of humanity", and the Unitarian preacher John White Chadwick from New York wrote that "The nation's grandest temple of religion opened its gates and lifted up its everlasting doors and bade the King of Science come in."

== Posthumous Autobiography ==
Darwin decided to leave a posthumous memoir for his family, and on Sunday 28 May 1876 he began Recollections of the Development of my Mind and Character. He found this candid private memoir easy going, covering his childhood, university, life on the Beagle expedition and developing work in science. A section headed "Religious Belief" opened just before his marriage, and frankly discussed his long disagreement with Emma. At first he had been unwilling to give up his faith, and had tried to "invent evidence" supporting the Gospels, but just as his clerical career had died a slow "natural death", so too did his belief in "Christianity as a divine revelation". "Inward convictions and feelings" had arisen from natural selection, as had survival instincts, and could not be relied on. He was quick to show Emma's side of the story and pay tribute to "your mother, ... so infinitely my superior in every moral quality ... my wise adviser and cheerful comforter".

The Autobiography of Charles Darwin was published posthumously, and quotes about Christianity were omitted from the first edition by Darwin's wife Emma and his son Francis because they were deemed dangerous for Charles Darwin's reputation. Only in 1958 did Darwin's granddaughter Nora Barlow publish a revised edition, which contained the omitted comments. This included statements discussed above in Autobiography on gradually increasing disbelief, and others such as the following:

By further reflecting that the clearest evidence would be requisite to make any sane man believe in the miracles by which Christianity is supported, — that the more we know of the fixed laws of nature the more incredible, do miracles become, — that the men at that time were ignorant and credulous to a degree almost incomprehensible by us, — that the Gospels cannot be proved to have been written simultaneously with the events, – that they differ in many important details, far too important as it seemed to me to be admitted as the usual inaccuracies of eyewitness; – by such reflections as these, which I give not as having the least novelty or value, but as they influenced me, I gradually came to disbelieve in Christianity as a divine revelation. The fact that many false religions have spread over large portions of the earth like wild-fire had some weight with me. Beautiful as is the morality of the New Testament, it can hardly be denied that its perfection depends in part on the interpretation which we now put on metaphors and allegories.

I can indeed hardly see how anyone ought to wish Christianity to be true; for if so the plain language of the text seems to show that the men who do not believe, and this would include my Father, Brother and almost all my best friends, will be everlastingly punished. And this is a damnable doctrine.

The old argument of design in nature, as given by Paley, which formerly seemed to me so conclusive, fails, now that the law of natural selection had been discovered. We can no longer argue that, for instance, the beautiful hinge of a bivalve shell must have been made by an intelligent being, like the hinge of a door by man. There seems to be no more design in the variability of organic beings and in the action of natural selection, than in the course which the wind blows. Everything in nature is the result of fixed laws.

At the present day [c. 1872] the most usual argument for the existence of an intelligent God is drawn from the deep inward conviction and feelings which are experienced by most persons. But it cannot be doubted that Hindoos, Mahomadans and others might argue in the same manner and with equal force in favor of the existence of one God, or of many Gods, or as with the Buddhists of no God ... This argument would be a valid one if all men of all races had the same inward conviction of the existence of one God: But we know that this is very far from being the case. Therefore I cannot see that such inward convictions and feelings are of any weight as evidence of what really exists.

== The Lady Hope Story ==
The "Lady Hope Story", first published in 1915, claimed that Darwin had reverted to Christianity on his sickbed. The claims were rejected by Darwin's children and have been dismissed as false by historians.

== Bibliography ==
- Aveling, E. B. (1883), The Religious Views of Charles Darwin, London: Freethought Publishing Company
- Babbage, Charles (1838), The Ninth Bridgewater Treatise (2nd ed.), London: John Murray
- Browne, E. Janet (1995), Charles Darwin: vol. 1 Voyaging, London: Jonathan Cape, ISBN 1-84413-314-1
- Brown, Frank Burch (1986). "The Evolution of Darwin's Theism". Journal of the History of Biology. 19 (1). Springer: 1–45. doi:10.1007/BF00346616. ISSN 0022-5010. JSTOR 4330957.
- Darwin, Charles (1871), The Descent of Man, and Selection in Relation to Sex (1st ed.), London: John Murray
- Darwin, Charles (1887), Darwin, Francis (ed.), The life and letters of Charles Darwin, including an autobiographical chapter, London: John Murray
- Darwin, Charles (1958), Barlow, Nora (ed.), The Autobiography of Charles Darwin 1809–1882. With the original omissions restored. Edited and with appendix and notes by his granddaughter Nora Barlow, London: Collins
- Desmond, Adrian; Moore, James (1991), Darwin, London: Michael Joseph, Penguin Group, ISBN 0-7181-3430-3
- FitzRoy, Robert (1839), Voyages of the Adventure and Beagle, Volume II, London: Henry Colburn
- Freeman, R. B. (2007), Charles Darwin: A companion (2d online ed.), The Complete Works of Charles Darwin Online
- Herbert, Sandra (1991), "Charles Darwin as a prospective geological author", British Journal for the History of Science, no. 24, pp. 159–192
- Keynes, Richard (2001), Charles Darwin's Beagle Diary, Cambridge University Press, ISBN 0-521-23503-0
- Miles, Sara Joan (2001), "Charles Darwin and Asa Gray Discuss Teleology and Design", Perspectives on Science and Christian Faith, vol. 53, pp. 196–201
- Moore, James (2005), Darwin – A 'Devil's Chaplain'? (PDF), American Public Media
- Moore, James (2006), Evolution and Wonder – Understanding Charles Darwin, Speaking of Faith (Radio Program), American Public Media, archived from the original on 22 December 2008
- Paley, W. (1809), Natural Theology: or, Evidences of the Existence and Attributes of the Deity (12th ed.)
- Quammen, David (2006), The Reluctant Mr. Darwin, New York: Atlas Books, ISBN 0-393-05981-2
- Sulloway, Frank J. (2006), "Why Darwin Rejected Intelligent Design" (PDF), in Brockman, John (ed.), Intelligent Thought: Science versus the Intelligent Design Movement, New York: Vintage, pp. 107–126
- van Wyhe, John (27 March 2007), "Mind the gap: Did Darwin avoid publishing his theory for many years?", Notes and Records of the Royal Society, 61 (2): 177–205, doi:10.1098/rsnr.2006.0171, S2CID 202574857
- van Wyhe, John (1 September 2008), Darwin: The Story of the Man and His Theories of Evolution, London: André Deutsch Ltd, ISBN 978-0-233-00251-4
- van Wyhe, John; Pallen, Mark J. (2012), "The 'Annie Hypothesis': Did the Death of His Daughter Cause Darwin to 'Give up Christianity'?", Centaurus, 54 (2): 105–123, doi:10.1111/j.1600-0498.2012.00256.x, PMID 22834067
- Mandelbaum, Maurice (1958). "Darwin's Religious Views". Journal of the History of Ideas. 19 (3). University of Pennsylvania Press: 363–378. doi:10.2307/2708041. ISSN 0022-5037. JSTOR 2708041.
- Pleins, J. David (2013). The Evolving God: Charles Darwin on the Naturalness of Religion. Bloomsbury Publishing USA.
- von Sydow, Momme (2005), "Charles Darwin: A Christian Undermining Christianity?" (PDF), in Knight, David M.; Eddy, Matthew D. (eds.), Science and Beliefs: From Natural Philosophy to Natural Science, 1700–1900, Burlington: Ashgate, pp. 141–156, ISBN 0-7546-3996-7
- Yates, Simon (2003), The Lady Hope Story: A Widespread Falsehood, TalkOrigins Archive
