= The Folly of Revolution =

2022 book by Scott Rohrer

The Folly of Revolution: Thomas Bradbury Chandler and the Loyalist Mind in a Democratic Age
- Cover
- Author: S. Scott Rohrer
- Language: English
- Subject: Thomas Bradbury Chandler, American Loyalists, American Revolution
- Genre: Biography, History
- Publisher: Pennsylvania State University Press
- Publication date: March 8, 2022
- Publication place: United States
- Media type: Print (hardcover, paperback), e-book
- Pages: 248
- ISBN: 978-0-271-09219-5
- Preceded by: Wandering Souls: Protestant Migrations in America, 1630–1865 (2010)

The Folly of Revolution: Thomas Bradbury Chandler and the Loyalist Mind in a Democratic Age is a 2022 book by American historian S. Scott Rohrer. The work is an intellectual biography of Thomas Bradbury Chandler (1726–1790), an Anglican minister from New Jersey who led the campaign for an American episcopate in the 1760s and wrote several pamphlets opposing the American Revolution. Rohrer uses Chandler's personal library catalog and other primary sources to reconstruct the intellectual origins of his monarchical and high church worldview. He focuses on obscure British debates from the late seventeenth and early eighteenth centuries. These include the nonjurors controversy and the Bangorian controversy. In 2026, the book received an honorable mention for best book-length biography, the Annibel Jenkins Prize, from the American Society for Eighteenth-Century Studies.

== Background ==
In a 2022 interview with CurrentPub, Rohrer explained that the book grew out of the author's earlier work on religion and the American Revolution. In his 2014 book Jacob Green's Revolution, a biography of a radical Presbyterian minister who supported American independence, Rohrer used Chandler as a contrasting figure, presenting his story in vignettes between chapters. Rohrer later decided that Chandler warranted a full biographical treatment, noting that no previous scholar had published a complete biography of the minister despite his significance as a pamphleteer and leader among northern Anglican clergy.

The research presented challenges owing to gaps in the primary sources. Chandler's family burned his personal papers when he fled to London in 1775, and little documentation of his daily or family life survives. Rohrer relied instead on a catalog of Chandler's personal library, which listed approximately 1,500 works. By identifying the full titles and analyzing the subjects Chandler studied, Rohrer traced the intellectual origins of his opposition to revolution to the Glorious Revolution of 1688 and the subsequent English debates over governmental authority and democracy.

Rohrer sought to challenge the traditional scholarly portrayal of Chandler as an extremist out of touch with American society. He argued that many colonists, possibly a majority in 1774, shared Chandler's admiration for monarchy and his belief that the British constitution was nearly perfect. The book also aimed to illuminate how Chandler's intellectual formation differed from that of the American revolutionaries. Whereas Whig intellectuals drew inspiration from classical antiquity and the English Civil Wars of the 1640s, Chandler focused on the Glorious Revolution of 1688–89 and its aftermath, studying debates over authority, sovereignty, and episcopacy that were largely unfamiliar to his revolutionary counterparts.

== Summary ==
The book is an intellectual biography of Thomas Bradbury Chandler (1726–1790), an Anglican minister whom historian Bernard Bailyn described as being in the forefront of loyalist writers who challenged Whig ideology at its weakest point. Rohrer uses Chandler's personal library catalog and other primary sources to explore a central question that animated loyalist thought: how could social and political order survive when subjects possessed the right to challenge authority? He seeks to recover an alternative vision of the Revolutionary era—a monarchical world of hierarchy and obedience that has largely receded from historical memory.

Rohrer positions the work as an intervention in the historiography of loyalism. Whereas scholars have often portrayed loyalists as sharing the same intellectual sources as their revolutionary counterparts but arriving at opposite conclusions, he argues that Chandler drew on different and more obscure corners of British history than did American Whigs. While revolutionaries looked to classical antiquity, the English Civil Wars, and thinkers such as John Locke for inspiration, Chandler immersed himself in the debates surrounding the Glorious Revolution of 1688–89, especially the protests of the nonjurors (clergy who refused to swear allegiance to William and Mary) and the Bangorian controversy sparked by Bishop Benjamin Hoadly in 1717. Chandler collected over one hundred books and pamphlets on these relatively obscure episodes alone, and he argues that these sources—rather than the classical republicanism favored by Whigs—shaped his understanding of obedience, rebellion, and the essential connection between episcopacy and monarchical government.

Rohrer opens by recounting Chandler's early life and religious formation. He traces his upbringing in a wealthy Connecticut Puritan family before his conversion to Anglicanism at Yale College and his subsequent theological training under the Reverend Samuel Johnson. Rohrer then scrutinizes the intellectual foundations of Chandler's worldview through his study of Tudor and Stuart history—especially the writings of Richard Hooker and the debates over episcopacy. The author shows that Chandler valued order above all else and disdained its two greatest threats: democracy and revolution. Unlike other colonial intellectuals who looked to ancient Athens or Rome for guidance, Chandler trained his focus on late seventeenth- and early eighteenth-century Britain, where he found arguments defending monarchy, passive obedience, and the importance of a state church in buttressing governmental authority.

A substantial portion of the book addresses Chandler's leadership of the campaign to establish an Anglican bishop in British North America during the 1760s, culminating in his 1767 pamphlet An Appeal to the Public. For Chandler, the arrival of a bishop would strengthen both the Church of England and the Crown's authority in colonies where democracy was gaining ground. The campaign generated fierce opposition from Presbyterians and Congregationalists, who viewed it as threatening their civil and religious liberties and as part of a broader British plot to enslave the colonies. Rohrer traces the pamphlet wars and newspaper debates that followed, as well as Chandler's clashes with critics including William Livingston and Charles Chauncy.

Chandler directly opposed the revolutionary movement through three political pamphlets published between 1774 and 1775: The American Querist, A Friendly Address to All Reasonable Americans, and What Think Ye of the Congress Now? These tracts warned colonists about the dangers that rebellious subjects posed to government and society, defended parliamentary authority, and denounced the Continental Congress. Chandler's attacks made him a marked man; the Sons of Liberty burned his writings, and armed militia marched on his house. In May 1775, he fled to New York and subsequently to London, where he spent a decade in exile while continuing to advocate for an American episcopate and lobbying for financial support for persecuted American clergy.

An epilogue considers the fate of Chandler's monarchical worldview in the new American republic following his return to Elizabeth Town in 1785 and his death in 1790. Rohrer notes a measure of vindication for Chandler in the 1780s, as former revolutionary leaders—including his old neighbor and nemesis William Livingston—grew alarmed at democratic chaos and campaigned for a federal constitution that would create a powerful executive and check popular excesses. Yet Rohrer argues that modern conservatism ultimately diverged from Chandler's traditionalism: post-1790 conservatives embraced individualism and came to see government as an enemy of liberty rather than its protector, while their historical memory drew from the American Revolution rather than the Glorious Revolution. Chandler's world—resting on the union of church and state, on monarchy and episcopacy, on hierarchy and obedience—belonged to a different era entirely. The book includes an appendix cataloging Chandler's library of nearly two thousand volumes, which serves as primary evidence for reconstructing his intellectual world; the author published the full catalog on his website.

== Reviews ==
Gregg Frazer praised the work as well-written and well-researched, reflecting an impressive engagement with pamphlets, tracts, letters, books, and newspaper articles. He found that the author effectively laid out the theoretical groundwork behind Chandler's thinking, particularly regarding Tudor history and the debates surrounding the Glorious Revolution. However, Frazer offered a significant criticism: the title promised one thing while the text delivered something else. He observed that only twenty-four pages addressed the titular subject of revolution and loyalism, whereas the campaign for an American bishop dominated the narrative. Frazer concluded that the work "is not fundamentally about the folly of revolution or about the loyalist mind" but rather "about a high churchman's mind and the relationship between church and state," recommending it as a study of that subject rather than as a treatment of revolution or loyalism more broadly.

Daniel Diez Couch assessed the work as a convincing and finely detailed biographical study that situated its subject as a major theological and political figure in a network of colonial Anglican ministers. He commended the author for doing "an admirable job of examining a range of intellectual traditions" through the lens of Chandler's life and learning, and for skillfully balancing the historical and the biographical. Couch noted that the author usefully recovered important primary documents for scholars, though he observed that the study appeared hesitant to dwell on certain philosophical incongruities in Chandler's thought. He concluded that the work succeeded in its ambition, restoring an influential figure whose thought had receded from historical memory while chronicling the loyalist mind "at the very moment that history swerves in a different direction."

== Awards and honorable mentions ==
- An honorable mention for best book-length biography, the Annibel Jenkins Prize, from the American Society for Eighteenth-Century Studies.
