= First Unitarian Congregational Society =

Unitarian Universalist congregation in Brooklyn, New York, U.S.

Coordinates: 40.69529°N 73.99282°W

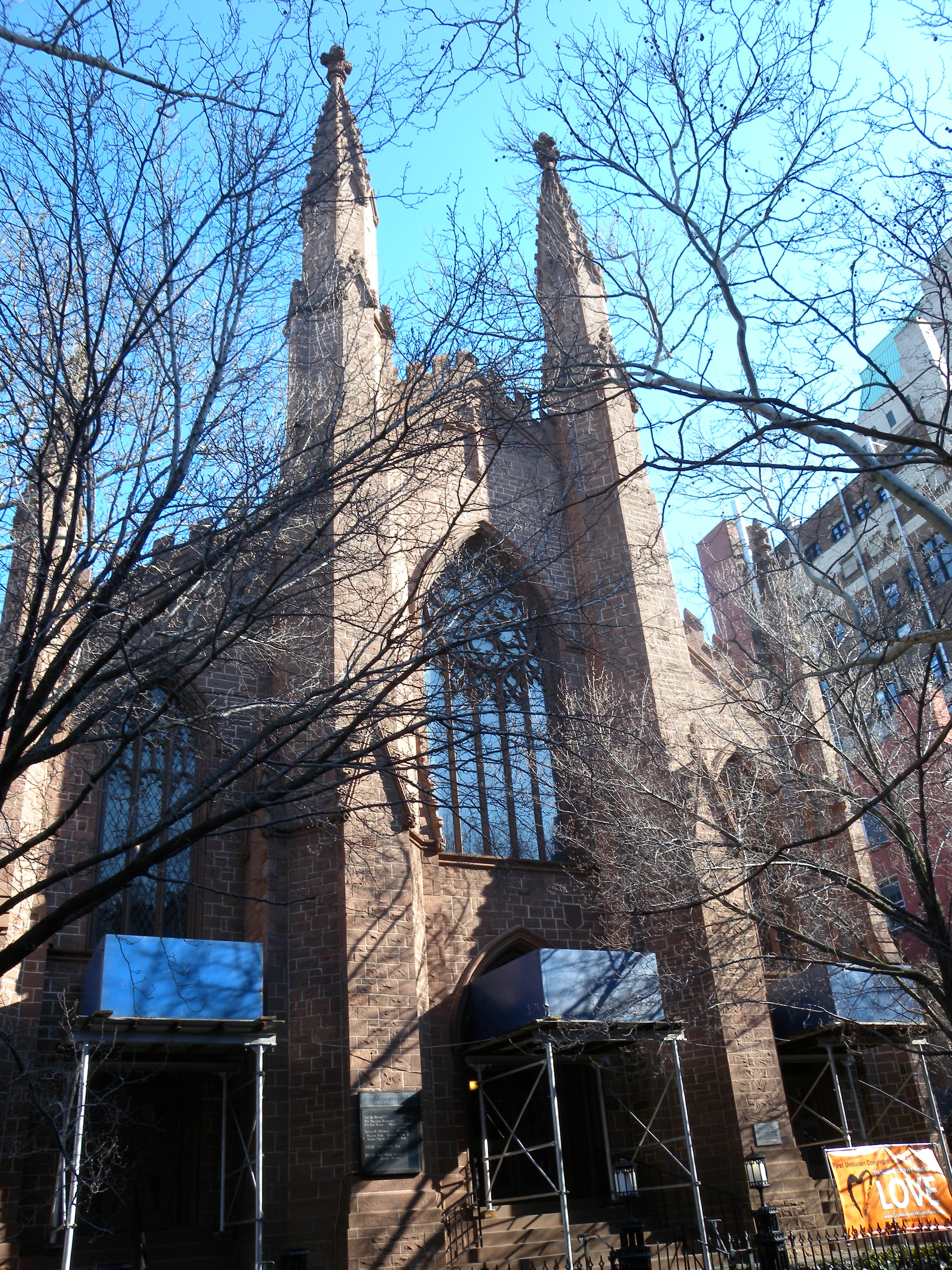
First Unitarian Congregational Society in Brooklyn in 2010

First Unitarian Congregational Society in Brooklyn is a Unitarian Universalist congregation in Brooklyn, New York. The Society was established in 1833 and has been worshiping in its historic Gothic Revival Sanctuary since 1844. The Sanctuary is adorned with stained glass windows and a Louis C. Tiffany angel mosaic. It is one of the earliest Unitarian congregations in the United States, established just eight years after the American Unitarian Association was formed in 1825.

== History ==
Tired of the ferry ride to Unitarian services in Manhattan, and weary of being rebuffed by other Brooklyn churches, the founders held the first Unitarian worship and Sunday school in August of 1833. After meeting in rented halls and buying a building on Adams Street, the members purchased the current site and secured Minard Lafever as architect. His design marks the beginning of the Gothic Revival in Brooklyn. The building was dedicated in 1844.

Over the years, three other Unitarian societies were formed, flourished and eventually rejoined the First Church. Samuel Longfellow, brother of the poet Henry and himself a noted poet, served the Second Unitarian Church (Brooklyn, New York). That church also ordained the first woman to the Unitarian ministry, Celia Burleigh. Prominent in the history of the First Unitarian Church is a tradition of social ministry that includes youth work, a settlement house for immigrants, support for the Civil Rights Movement and opposition to the Indo-China war.

Ana Levy-Lyons served the congregations for 15 years as Minister. Levy-Lyons, who discovered her Jewish background in her 20s, left the congregation in 2024 to practice Judaism and train as a rabbi.
