= Second Unitarian Church (Brooklyn) =

Church building in New York City, US

Coordinates: 40.688°N 73.995°W

The Second Unitarian Church in Brooklyn was a historic church in Cobble Hill, Brooklyn, New York City. It was built from 1857 to 1858 and was demolished in 1962. The Church became known as a prominent cultural center in Brooklyn. One of the church's members, Mary White Ovington, co-founded the NAACP, and the church was an abolitionist hub.

The former site of the church is now Cobble Hill Park.

== Background ==
In the mid-nineteenth century, new religious congregations arose in the Cobble Hill area due to the proximity to South Ferry and Manhattan. Immigrant centers developed around their respective churches, and more churches were built. In 1887, the Brooklyn Daily Eagle called Clinton Street "a highway of churches," and described twelve churches erected between 1841 and 1869 in the area between Pierrepont Street and Third Place on Clinton Street. One of these was the Second Unitarian Church, built on the corner of Clinton and Congress Streets.

== History ==
=== 19th Century ===
Unitarian liberal families moved to Brooklyn mainly from New England and Europe, and between 1833 and 1902 organized four congregations in Brooklyn, New York. The first service of the Unitarian Congregation in Brooklyn was held in 1833. In 1835, the congregation purchased the existing Second Presbyterian Church on Adams Street for their use. In 1837, Frederick W. Holland became a minister of the congregation. Holland's preaching was deemed too orthodox by some of the families and the congregation was divided.

The new Society, called the Second Unitarian Congregational Society, was formed in 1840 with Frederick A. Farley as its Minister. When Holland resigned from the First Unitarian Society in 1842, the congregations reunited for a short time, but differences in ideology opened old wounds, and in 1851 the Second Unitarian Society began to hold separate services again. For several years, in order to hold service and Sunday School, the Second Society rented rooms in various locations throughout Brooklyn Heights.

In 1853, Samuel Longfellow became minister of the Second Church and the decision was made to build a permanent home for the congregation. Jacob Wrey Mould was commissioned as the architect and ground was broken in June 1857. The estimated cost of the building was originally US$14,000, but it would eventually cost more than US$25,000, leaving the Congregation with a debt of more than US$10,000 that would not be paid off until 1872. On March 2, 1858, Longfellow dedicated the New Chapel on the corner of Clinton and Congress for its use.

Longfellow's strong abolitionist preaching was not popular among the new members of the church. However, the liberal members of the Congregation loved their minister. Because of Longfellow's strong abolitionist preaching, the Church was controversial and grew in debt as some members felt offended. Longfellow resigned from his ministry in the Second Church in April 1860.

Following Longfellow, the Reverend, Nathan Augustus Staples (1861–63) became head of the church. His preaching strongly supported abolitionism and the science of the Herbert Spencer and Charles Darwin’s discoveries. During the American Civil War, the Second Church was involved in organizing donations to the Union front. His successor, the John White Chadwick, also a supporter of Darwinism, lead the church from 1864 to 1904. He continued preaching previous ministers' theology in most of his sermons. Chadwick attracted many new members with his preaching and the Congregation was finally able to pay its debt in 1872.

The Brooklyn Ethical Association held its first meetings in the Second Unitarian Church in 1880s, having Chadwick as one of its most valuable members. The Second Church’s Female Employment Society had also grown out of “the Little Church on the Corner”. According to Olive Hoogenboom, "The Second Church remained a center of controversy for half of its seventy-four-year existence".

=== 20th Century ===
After John White Chadwick, the Second Unitarian Church was led by Caleb S. S. Dutton (1907–14) and Charles H. Lyttle (1914–24), the last minister of the Second Church who brought the two Societies together in 1924.

By 1924, the demographics of Brooklyn were changing rapidly. New immigrants from Europe and other parts of the Americas were arriving daily. Brooklyn residents with established wealth were migrating to less crowded areas of Brooklyn, or Long Island. Both the First and the Second Unitarian Churches suffered great losses within its members between 1910 and 1920. On the last Sunday of December 1924, the Second Unitarian Congregation held a closing service at their Little Chapel. They merged with the First Unitarian Congregation in Brooklyn. The Third and Fourth Congregations followed.

=== Demolition ===
Because the ground on which the church was built did not belong to the Unitarian Congregation, the building was “rootless” in a sense. After the Second Congregation reunited with the First one, the “Little Church on the Corner” was abandoned, the lease was sold bringing very little profit and the belongings were sold or given away. In the 1940s, the Catholic Church sold the land with the church building and two large houses that also existed on the property. The houses that occupied the west of the property were torn down shortly. In 1962, three years before the establishment of the Landmark Preservation Commission, the church was torn down and the ground was designated by a new developer to build a new supermarket for the neighborhood.

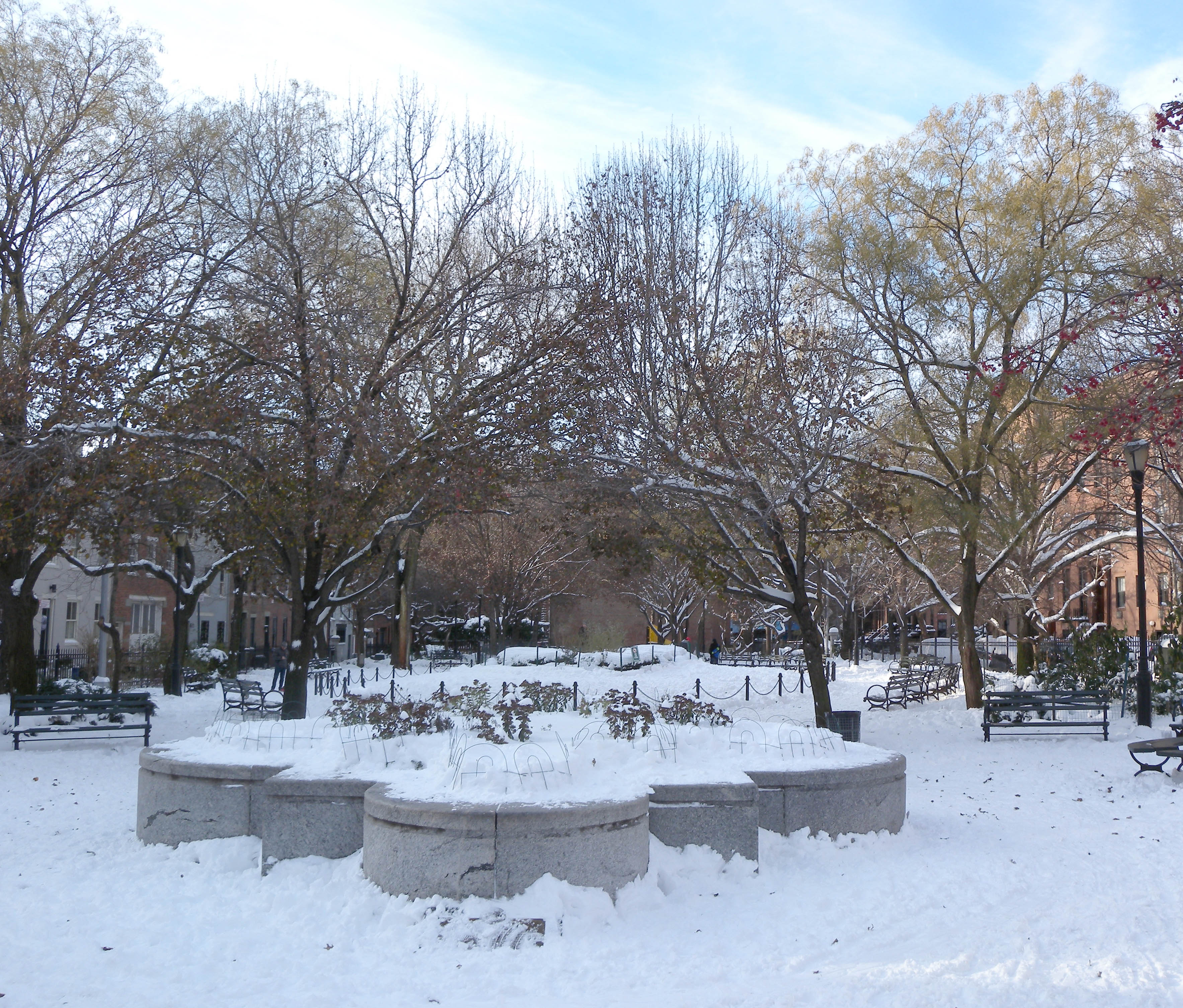
Cobble Hill Park

The neighborhood protested and insisted on designating the area for a park, which Cobble Hill did not have. As a result of the demands of the residents, on March 7, 1963 the plot became city property. On July 14, 1965 the Cobble Hill Park was dedicated, with historical houses surrounding it. After a renovation in 1989 the little park featured geometrically patterned bluestone paving, trees, playground, benches, cast-iron fence, and granite entrance columns.

== Architecture ==
According to the Brooklyn Daily Eagle, the Second Unitarian Church was designed in the Anglo-Italian style (original for its time), and it was much different in appearance from other churches in the neighborhood. The building was eighty-six feet long and seventy-five feet wide in the transept. The nave was forty feet wide and the transept was thirty-five.

The floor to ceiling height was twenty-five feet. The masonry building was made of brick and overlaid with brown mastic. Aside from the brown mastic on the exterior, there was a “water table” line made of brown stone with wide stripe of Philadelphia faced brick on the top. The building was in the shape of the cruciform, with a low pitched roof covered with green and purple octagon slates in alternate rows – resembling a tortoise for which the church was called by some “the Church of the Holy Turtle”, however more often it was called “the Little Church on the Corner” or “New Chapel”.

In the centre of the roof was an ornate wooden ventilator, and the entire ridge of the roof was finished with the “ridge crest”.

The cornice was made of Caen stone and Philadelphia brick. The building had seventeen arched, stained glass windows with the tracery made of Caen stone. Located at the north-west corner of the church was a tower that measured forty-one feet. The tower was topped with a twenty-three feet tall octagonal belfry. The base of the belfry was ornamented with encaustic tiles on the face of the stonework. The roof of the tower was covered with slate tiles, with a cross above. The main entrance to the church was located at Clinton Street, through a porch, above which there was a rose-window with stained glass framed with Caen stone. Under the window was an inscription, "The truth shall make your free"–a famous quotation of the Church's beloved pastor, Longfellow. Inside he Church the walls were pearl grey.

The ceiling was rose-tinted and moulded between heavy beams of open timber roof, and part of the ceiling in the apse area was azure. The church held 104 pews made from black walnut and pine and upholstered with crimson damask, they were able to seat six hundred people. There were no obstructions as pillars or gallery, so the pulpit could be seen from every place in the church. To the right of the altar was a separate minister's room “with every convenience” and to the left, the organ and a place for the choir. During cold days the church was heated with furnaces. The building also contained a basement where the Sunday school and Library were located.
