= Stephen Longfellow =

American politician (1776–1849)

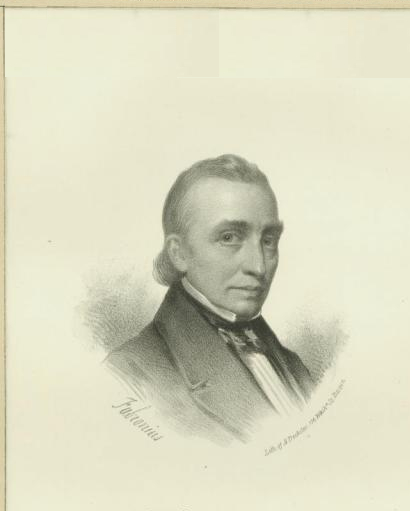

Member of the U.S. House of Representatives from Maine's 2nd district
- In office March 4, 1823 – March 3, 1825
- Preceded by: Mark Harris
- Succeeded by: John Anderson

Personal details
- Born: March 23, 1776 Gorham, Province of Massachusetts Bay, British America
- Died: August 2, 1849 (aged 73) Portland, Maine, United States
- Resting place: Western Cemetery
- Party: Federalist
- Spouse: Zilpah Wadsworth (m. 1804)
- Children: 8, including Henry and Samuel

Stephen Longfellow (March 23, 1776 – August 2, 1849) was a U.S. representative from Maine.

== Biography ==
Born in Gorham, Cumberland County, Province of Massachusetts Bay (now Gorham, Maine) to Stephen Longfellow and Patience (Young) Longfellow, Longfellow attended Phillips Academy, Andover, MA, and then from Harvard University in 1798. He studied law and was admitted to the bar in 1801 and commenced practice in Portland, Maine. He married Zilpah Wadsworth in 1804 and, with her, had eight children, including the poets Henry Wadsworth Longfellow and Samuel Longfellow.

He served as a member of the general court of Massachusetts in 1814 and 1815. He belonged to the Federalist Party and was a delegate to the Hartford Convention in 1814 and 1815. He also served as a Federalist presidential elector in 1816.

Longfellow was elected as an Adams-Clay Federalist to the Eighteenth Congress (March 4, 1823 – March 3, 1825). He was not a candidate for renomination in 1824 and resumed his law practice for a time.

He served as a member of the state house of representatives in 1826. He served as overseer of Bowdoin College, Brunswick, Maine, from 1811 to 1817 and was a trustee of the college from 1817 to 1836. He supported the Portland Athenaeum. One of its founding members, he also served as president of the Maine Historical Society in 1834.

Longfellow died in Portland, Maine, on August 2, 1849, and was buried in the Western Cemetery.

U.S. House of Representatives
Preceded by Mark Harris	Member of the U.S. House of Representatives from Maine's 2nd congressional district March 4, 1823 – March 3, 1825	Succeeded by John Anderson
