= Wanderlust: The Amazing Ida Pfeiffer, the First Female Tourist =

2019 biography by John van Wyhe

- First edition
- Author: John van Wyhe
- Language: English
- Subject: Ida Pfeiffer
- Publisher: NUS Press
- Publication date: 2019
- Publication place: Singapore
- Media type: Print
- Pages: 324 (first edition)
- ISBN: 978-9-813-25076-5
- OCLC: 1134538661

Wanderlust: The Amazing Ida Pfeiffer, the First Female Tourist is a 2019 biography, written by John van Wyhe, about Ida Pfeiffer, an Austrian world traveler, explorer, amateur naturalist, collector of biological and ethnographic specimens, and travel writer.

== Contents ==
This 324-page biography by van Wyhe tells, in six chapters, the story of Ida Pfeiffer née Reyer. She married a lawyer who was a widower 24 years her senior and had a grown son at the time of the marriage. She raised two sons in Vienna and at age 44 embarked upon a remarkable career of world travel, exploration, and travel writing. She was the first European woman to cross the interior of Borneo. In her travels she toured five continents and covered a total of 240,000 km (about 150,00 miles) at sea and 32,000 km (about 20,000 miles) on land. She wrote 13 books (now translated into at least seven languages) about her travels. She financed her travels by selling her travel books to a wide public and her collected items to museums. Van Wyhe's biography details her five adventurous, and dangerous, voyages. She journeyed in 1842 to the Holy Land, in 1845 to Iceland, Sweden and (what is now) Norway, in 1846–1848 circling the globe in 900 days, in 1851–1855 again circling the globe with travel to various localities in Europe, Asia, the Pacific islands, South America, the United States, and Canada, and finally in 1856–1858 to Madagascar. In Madagascar she became sick with a recurring fever which caused her to die at age 61 in Vienna in the residence of one of her brothers.

In her last travels to Madagascar, she received an autograph from Queen Ranavalona.
