= John Anderson (Maine politician) =

American politician (1792–1853)

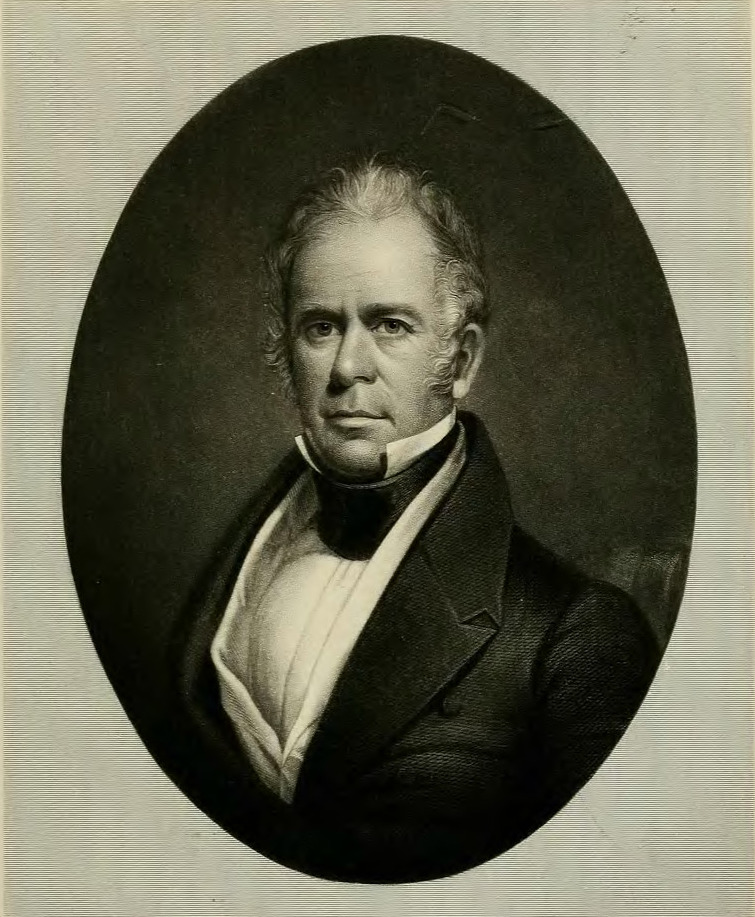

Member of the U.S. House of Representatives from Maine's 2nd district
- In office March 4, 1825 – March 3, 1833
- Preceded by: Stephen Longfellow
- Succeeded by: F.O.J. Smith

Personal details
- Born: July 30, 1792 Windham, Massachusetts, U.S. (now Maine)
- Died: August 21, 1853 (aged 61) Portland, Maine, U.S.
- Resting place: Town Cemetery, Windham, Maine, U.S.
- Party: Jacksonian Democrat
- Education: Bowdoin College

John Anderson (July 30, 1792 – August 21, 1853) was an American politician from Maine. Anderson served as United States Representative from Maine from 1825 to 1833.

== Biography ==
Anderson was born in Windham, Massachusetts (now in Maine) on July 30, 1792. He attended the common schools and graduated from Bowdoin College in 1813. He studied law, was admitted to the bar in 1816, and commenced practice in Portland.

He was elected a member of the Maine Senate and was elected to the Nineteenth and Twentieth Congresses and elected as a Jacksonian Democrat to the Twenty-first and Twenty-second Congresses (March 4, 1825 – March 3, 1833). He was chair of the Committee on Elections (Twentieth Congress), and chair of the Committee on Naval Affairs (Twenty-second Congress). He was not a candidate for renomination in 1832.

He was elected Mayor of Portland 1833–1836 and again in 1842 by 75 votes. He was appointed Maine United States Attorney 1833–1836. He was appointed collector of customs for the Port of Portland 1837 – 1841 and 1843 – 1848. He resumed the practice of law after his appointments were finished.

Anderson corresponded with President James K. Polk, with whom he had served in Congress, and invited him to Maine during his presidency.

== Death ==
Anderson died in Portland August 21, 1853. He is buried in Town Cemetery in Windham.

=== Legacy ===
Anderson Street in Portland is now named for him.

U.S. House of Representatives
Preceded by Stephen Longfellow	Member of the U.S. House of Representatives from Maine's 2nd congressional district March 4, 1825 – March 3, 1833	Succeeded by Francis Smith
