= The Autobiography of Charles Darwin =

1887 autobiography by Charles Darwin

The Life and Letters of Charles Darwin
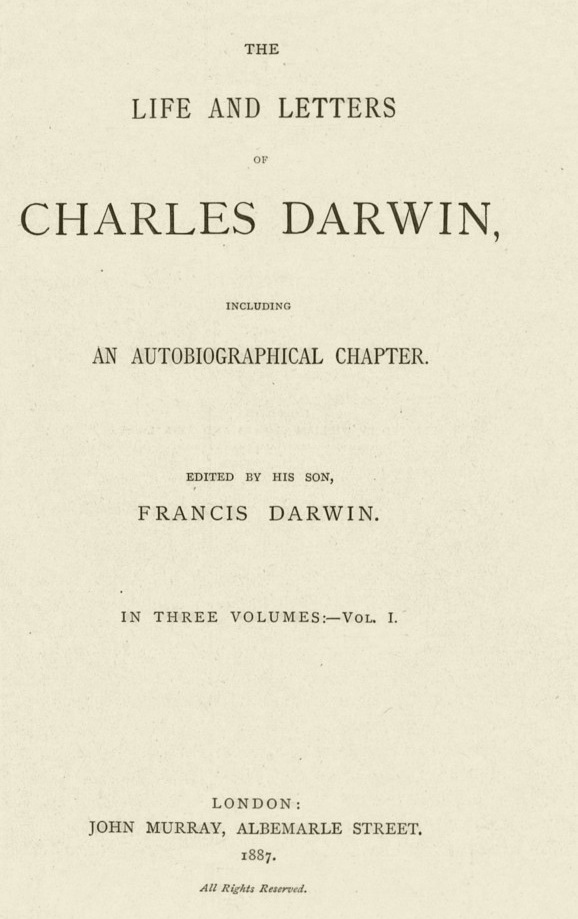
- Cover of the original edition of 1887.
- Author: Charles Darwin, edited by Francis Darwin
- Language: English
- Publisher: John Murray, London
- Publication date: 1887
- Publication place: England

The Autobiography of Charles Darwin is an autobiography by the English naturalist Charles Darwin.

Darwin wrote the text, which he entitled Recollections of the Development of my Mind and Character, for his family. He states that he started writing it on about May 28, 1876 and had finished it by August 3.

The text was published in 1887 (five years after Darwin's death) by John Murray as part of The Life and Letters of Charles Darwin, including an autobiographical chapter. The text printed in Life and Letters was edited by Darwin's son Francis Darwin, who removed several passages about Darwin's critical views of God and Christianity.

The omitted passages were later restored by Darwin's granddaughter Nora Barlow in a 1958 edition to commemorate the 100th anniversary of the publication of The Origin of Species. This edition was published in London by Collins under the title of The Autobiography of Charles Darwin 1809-1882. With the original omissions restored. Edited and with appendix and notes by his granddaughter Nora Barlow.

== Bibliography ==
- Darwin Online: Life and Letters and Autobiography
- Darwin, C.R. (ed by Barlow, N); The Autobiography of Charles Darwin. ISBN 0-393-31069-8 (1993 paperback edition)
- Darwin, Charles (1887), Darwin, Francis (ed.), The life and letters of Charles Darwin, including an autobiographical chapter, London: John Murray, ISBN 0-404-08417-6
- Darwin, Charles (1958), Barlow, Nora (ed.), The Autobiography of Charles Darwin 1809–1882. With the original omissions restored. Edited and with appendix and notes by his granddaughter Nora Barlow, London: Collins
- Darwin, Charles (2006), "Journal", in van Wyhe, John (ed.), [Darwin's personal 'Journal' (1809-1881)], Darwin Online, CUL-DAR158.1-76
