= Western Cemetery (Portland, Maine) =

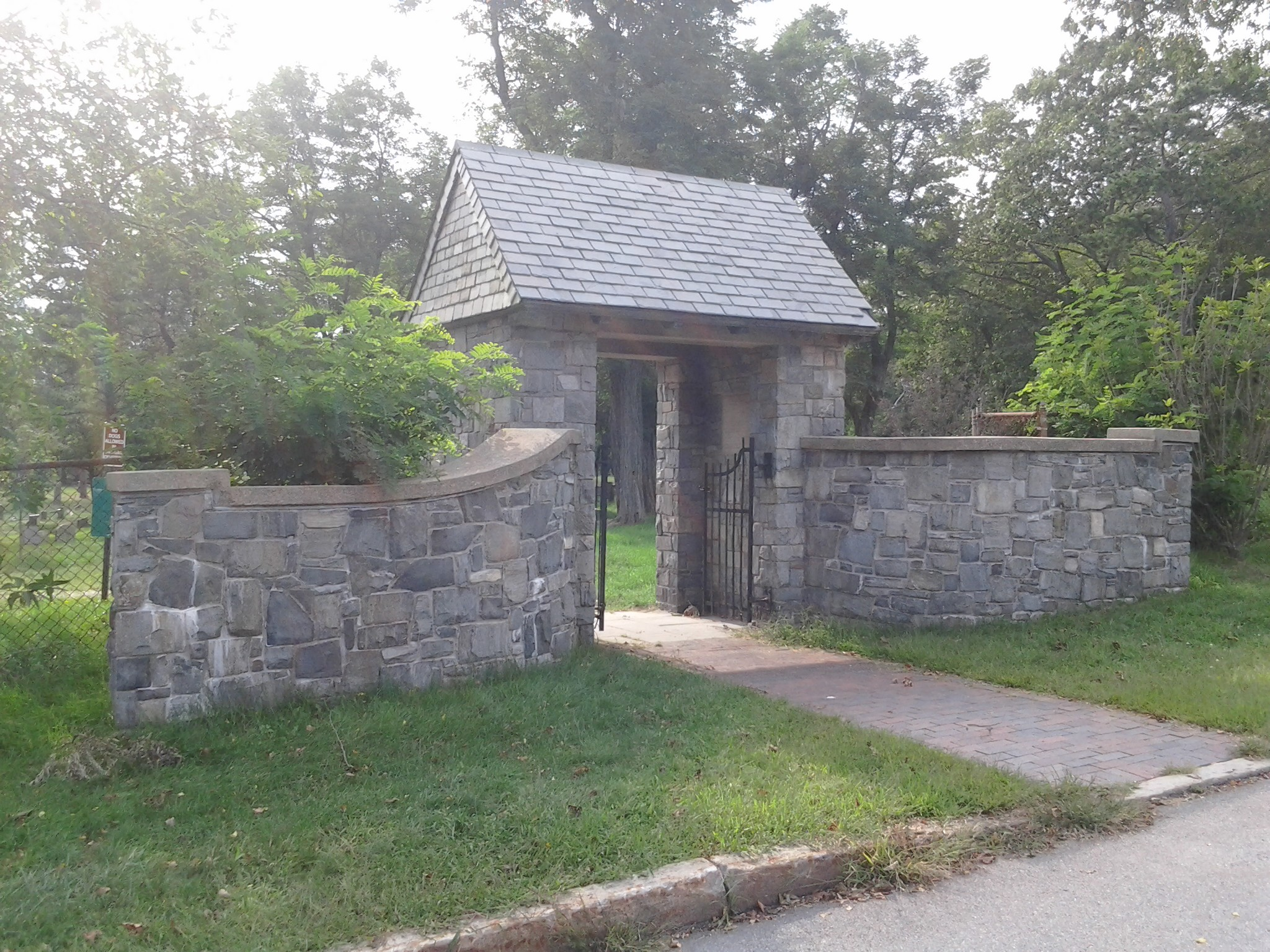
- The front gate to the Western Cemetery on Vaughan Street
- Interactive map of Western Cemetery

Details
- Established: 1829
- Location: Portland, Maine
- Country: United States
- Coordinates: 43°38′44″N 70°16′26″W
- Size: 12 acres (4.9 ha)
- No. of graves: ~6,600
- Find a Grave: Western Cemetery
- The Political Graveyard: Western Cemetery

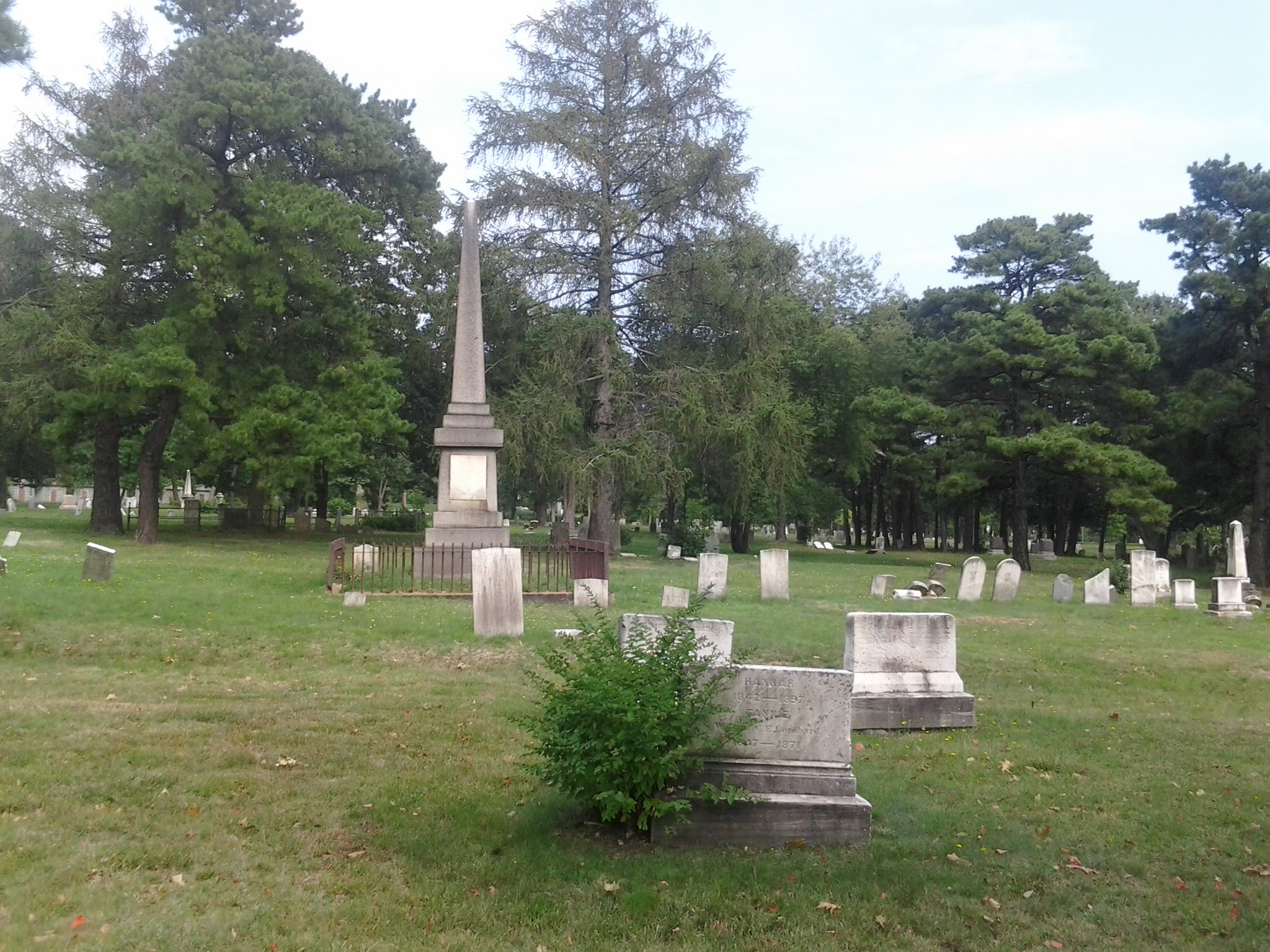
The Western Cemetery in September 2011.

The Western Cemetery is an urban cemetery located in the West End neighborhood of Portland, Maine, near the Western Promenade. It served as Portland's primary municipal burial ground from 1829 until 1852, when Evergreen Cemetery was established in the then-separate town of Deering.

The land was officially acquired by the city in 1829 and expanded in 1841 to its current size of 12 acres (4.9 ha). The design of lots and circulation paths was created by civil engineer James Hall in 1840. Western Cemetery remained active until 1910 and contains an estimated 6,600 marked and unmarked graves.

While one section of the cemetery was designated for the burial of the indigent, Western Cemetery served a wide range of Portland's population. Burials include Revolutionary and Civil War veterans, Irish immigrants, African American residents—including leaders of the historic Abyssinian Meeting House—and other prominent citizens. Some families later relocated remains to Evergreen Cemetery when space became limited, but many original burials remain.

Its main entrance, the Daveis Memorial Gate, was added in 1914 and designed by noted Maine architect John Calvin Stevens.

In October 2003, the cemetery began a restoration and reconstruction project overseen by the City of Portland in partnership with the Stewards of the Western Cemetery, and funded with municipal resources.

The Western Cemetery was added to the National Register of Historic Places in 2025.

== Desecrations and disorganization ==
The Western Cemetery is known for a large number of grave desecrations and general disorganization; for example, from July 1, 1988 to August 1, 1989, an estimated 1,942 tombs were desecrated. Likewise, it is unknown how many burials have taken place in the cemetery, though author William Jordan estimated 6,600. A plan was laid out in 1840, but the document was destroyed in the 1866 Great Fire alongside much of the city. A number of tombs have been opened with no contents found inside; for example the Longfellow tomb, home to the parents of Portland resident Henry Wadsworth Longfellow, was opened and nothing was found inside, with no record of what happened to those entombed there.

== Old Catholic Ground ==
The Old Catholic Ground is an area in the cemetery used for Catholics, mainly (Irish) immigrants who arrived in the community in the early to mid 19th century, and for those who fled the Great Hunger from 1845 to 1852. People were buried in the Catholic section of the cemetery because there was no stand alone Catholic burial place in the community prior to 1858. The Catholic section is also known for headstones containing references to the names of counties in Ireland, and is built on what used to be known as Brown's Hill. From 1858 through the 1870s, several dozen Catholic burials were removed from Western Cemetery and reinterred at the new Catholic Cemetery named Calvary Cemetery in South Portland, Maine when it opened in 1858. Calvary Cemetery is operated by the Diocese. In 1999, the Ancient Order of Hibernians, Division I, erected a stone marking the area as the Catholic Ground, and commemorating those who perished during, or fled from The Great Hunger (An Gorta Mór).

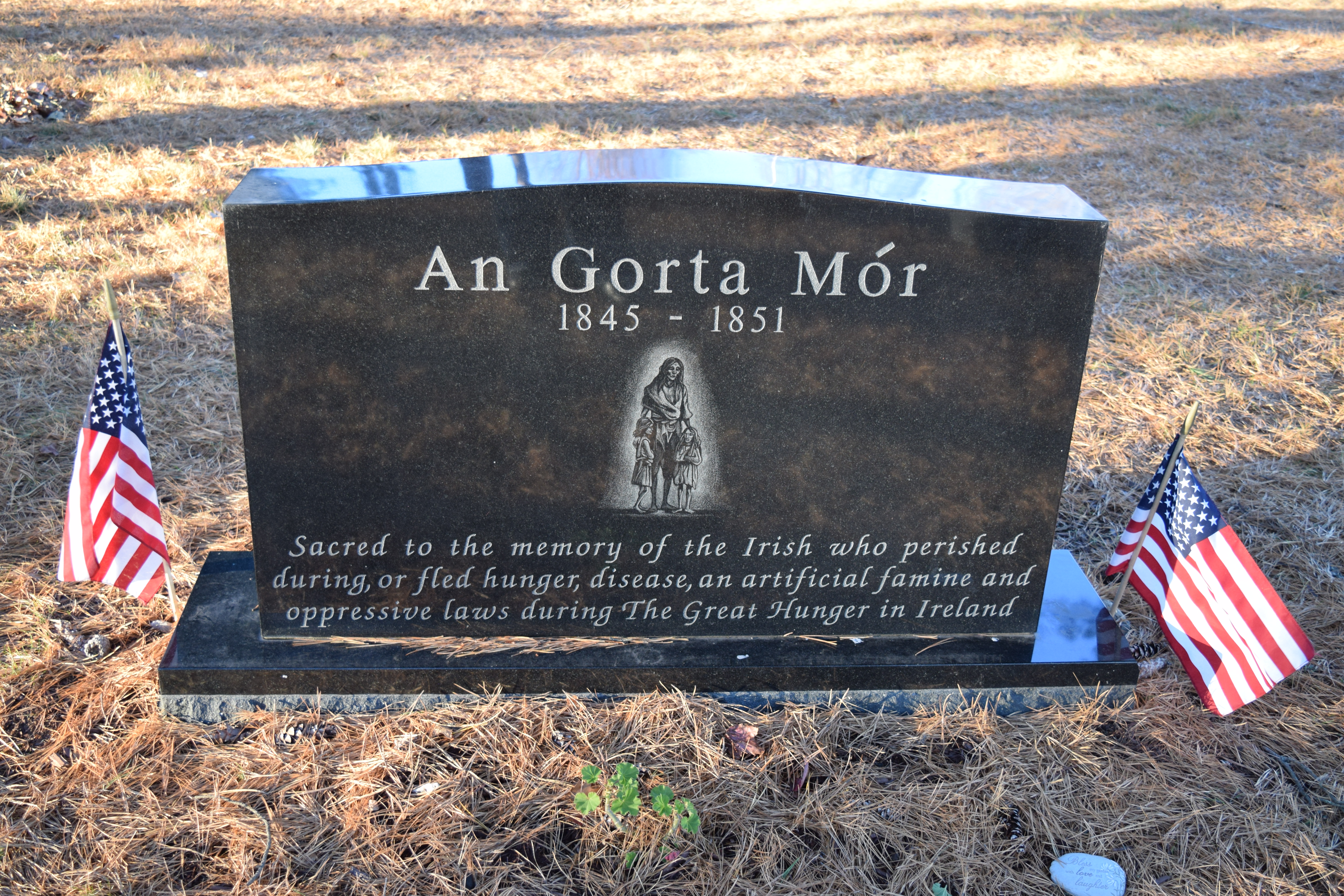
Great Hunger Memorial

== Notable burials ==
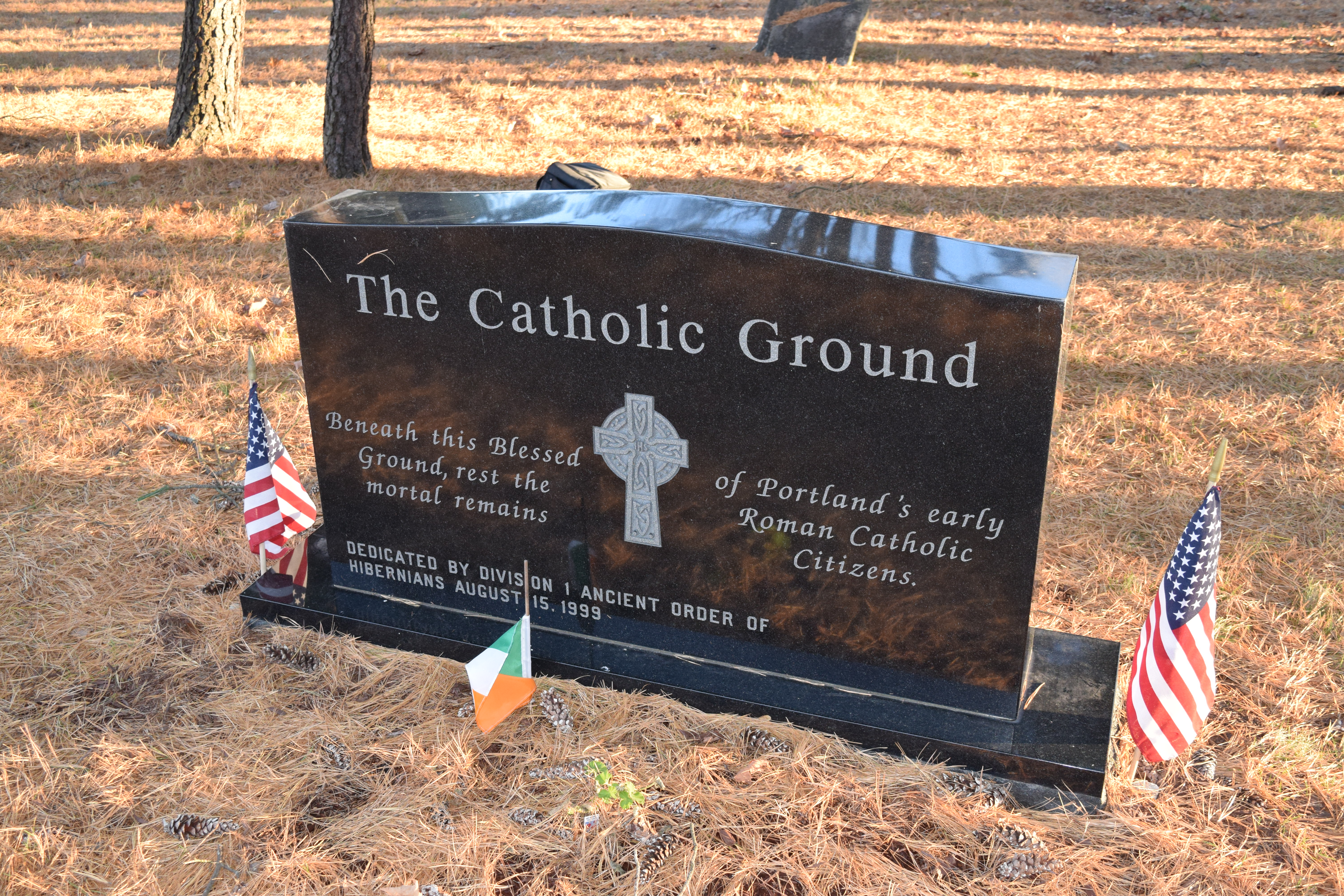
Stone marking the Irish Ground in Western Cemetery

- John Neal, 19th-century writer, critic, and lecturer
- Elijah Kellogg, Congregationalist minister, lecturer and author of popular boy's adventure books.
- Samuel Longfellow, clergyman and hymn writer.
- Stephen Longfellow, Congressman from Massachusetts, father of Henry Wadsworth Longfellow
- Prentiss Mellen, First Chief Justice of the Maine Supreme Court
