= Victorian Web =

1980s hypertext project

The Victorian Web is a hypertext project derived from hypermedia environments, intermedia and Storyspace, initially created between 1988 and 1990. Launched containing 1,500 documents, it had grown to over 142,700 items by February 2026. In contrast to archives and web-based libraries, the Victorian Web presents its images and documents, including entire books, as nodes in a network of complex connections. The Victorian Web emphasizes links rather than searches, and can be regarded as having anticipated the World Wide Web.

In 2020, victorianweb.org became a 501(3)c non-profit corporation. The Victorian Web Foundation’s Board of Directors are Jacqueline Banerjee (President); Diane Josefowicz (Secretary); Noah Landow (Treasurer); Matthew Pontefract (Board Member); and Roman Katz (Vice Treasurer).

The Victorian Web has many contributors, but unlike a wiki, it is edited. Originally conceived in 1987 as a means of helping scholars and students in see connections between different fields, the site has expanded in its scope and vision. For example, commentary on the works of Charles Dickens is linked to his life and to contemporary social and political history, drama, religion, book illustration, and economics.

The Victorian Web incorporates primary and secondary texts (including book reviews) in the areas of economics, literature, philosophy, religion, political and social history, science, technology, and the visual arts. The visual arts section ranges widely over painting, photography, book design and illustration, sculpture, and the decorative arts, including ceramics, furniture, stained glass and metalwork. Jewelry, textiles, and costume are amongst other topics discussed and illustrated on its website. Awards indicate that it is particularly strong in literature, painting, architecture, sculpture, book illustration, history and religion.

== History ==
The 1,500 or so documents that constitute its kernel were created in 1988–90 by its former webmaster and editor-in-chief George P. Landow (Professor of English and Art History Emeritus at Brown University), with his then graduate assistants David Cody, Glenn Everett, and Kathryn Stockton, as part of the IRIS Intermedia Project at Brown University. This was funded as a proof-of-concept networked hypermedia project by IBM, Apple, the Annenberg Foundation, and other sponsors. It was expanded by contributions from a professor at Vassar College (Anthony S. Wohl), material from the Intermedia Dickens Web (Landow, Julie Launhardt, and Paul Kahn), material from the In Memoriam Web (Landow, Jon Lanestedt), and other sources.

In 1990 its pre-web version received the EDUCOM/ENCRIPTAL Higher Education Software Award from National Center for Research to Improve Postsecondary Teaching and Learning; in 2000 it won the Art History Webmasters Award in Paris; in 2010 the London Times declared it "An outstanding resource for literature and history students," saying that it "also makes for fascinating reading from anyone interested in matters ranging from what aspects of Victorian culture have been lost with decimalisation to how people sent letters in those days and the rhyming slang of the day." It has received many awards both for the entire site and specific sections, such as history, visual arts, evolution, and religion. It has been recommended by Britannica, the BBC, the History Channel, and agencies or organizations in England, France, Italy, Netherlands, Russia, Singapore, Sweden, and the United States. As of 19 February 2026, the Victorian Web has 142,709 documents and images online. Well over 3000 websites link in, and it has received over 1.5 million page-views in a month.

In 2000–2001 when Landow was the Shaw Professor of English and Digital Culture (Comp. Science) at the National University of Singapore (NUS), that university paid for an Apache server, staff to set up and maintain it, and undergraduate research assistants, who did scanning and OCR work, and Postdoctoral and Senior Fellows, who created content. Dr. John van Wyhe created the vast majority of material in the science section, which includes primary materials in both French and English, and Dr. Marjorie Bloy created almost all the material about Victorian social and political history. Dr. Tamara S. Wagner, a fellow who worked primarily on a sister site, the Postcolonial Literature and Culture Web, also contributed essays on literary subjects. Professor Philip V. Allingham spent a month at NUS as a Research Fellow, where he began the large section on book illustration and Victorian novelists to which he still contributes.

Since 2000, hundreds of scholars, chiefly from the UK and North America, have contributed thousands more documents and images. The University Scholars Program of the National University of Singapore hosted the website until 2008.

A Spanish version of the Victorian Web (http://www.victorianweb.org/espanol/index.html) began in October 2009 as part of an intercultural experiment under the direction of Landow and Dr. Asuncion López-Varela Azcarte of the Facultad de Filologia de Universidad Complutense de Madrid. The translation project was initially supported by grants from her university and from Madrid (Comunidad de Madrid CCG08-UCM/HUM-3851) and the Ministry of Science and Innovation (Ministerio de Ciencia e Innovación MICINN FFI2008-05388/FISO). López-Varela has recruited approximately 100 volunteers, and thus far 5,000 documents have been translated. There is also a much smaller French version of the site, with translations currently being contributed by Sabrina Laurent. On 29 March 2010 Landow gave permission to the Library of Congress to archive the Victorian Web for its historical importance.

== Editorial board ==
Members of the present editorial board, who are all frequent contributors, are Dr. Jacqueline Banerjee (Editor-in-Chief and Webmaster); Dr. Diane Greco Josefowicz (Managing Editor and Science and Technology Editor, USA); Dr. Simon Cooke (Senior Editor, and Editor for Book Illustration and Design, UK); Professor Philip Allingham (Contributing Editor, Canada); Dr. Andrzej Diniejko (Contributing Editor, Poland); Dr Joanna Devereux (Editor for Gender Matters, Canada); Professor Richard Gibson and Dr. Timothy Larsen (Joint Editors for Religion, USA); Professors Lisa Surridge and Mary Elizabeth Leighton (for the Pregnancy and Childbirth Project, Canada); Professors Kristen Guest and Ronja Frank (for the Horses in the Victorian Age project, Canada); and Dr. John Salmon and Dr. Colin Price (Contributing Photographers for Sculpture, Architecture, Stained Glass etc, UK).

== See also ==
- Victorian era
- Victorian literature
- Victorian architecture
