= Thomas Bradbury Chandler =

Anglican minister from New Jersey

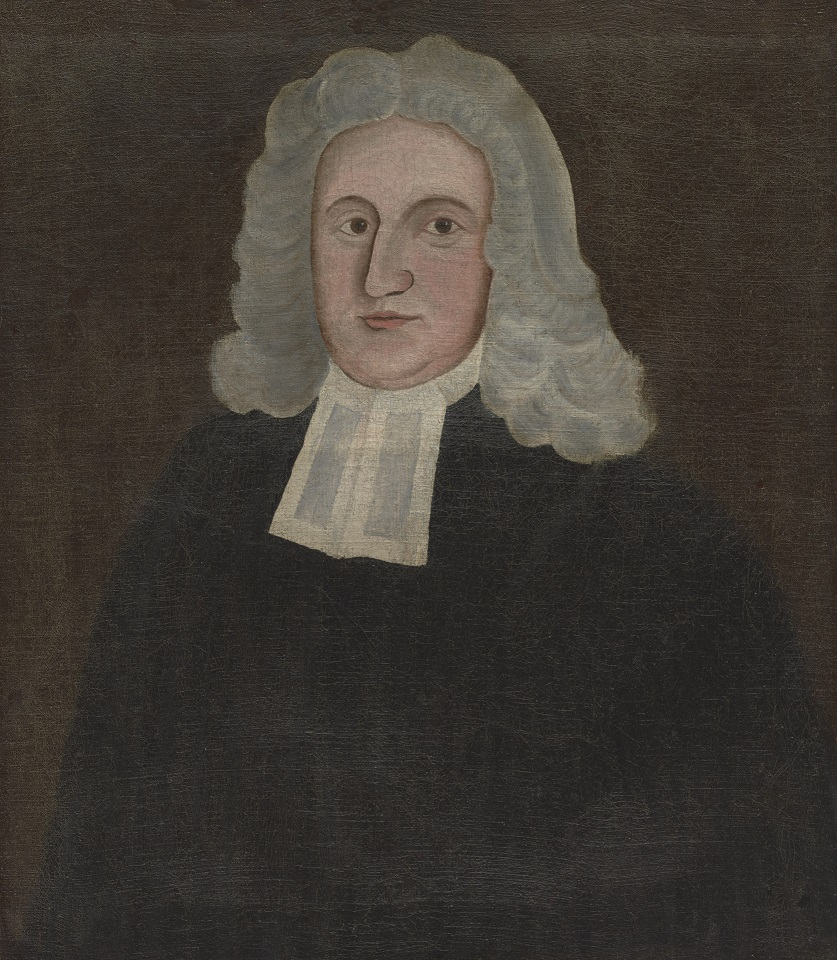
- Portrait from Yale Art Gallery
- Born: April 26, 1726
- Died: June 17, 1790 (aged 64)
- Occupation: Priest

Thomas Bradbury Chandler (April 26, 1726 – June 17, 1790) was an American priest of the Church of England and author, who removed to England during the American Revolutionary War but returned to his long-time parish in Elizabeth, New Jersey and helped found the Episcopal Church in the United States of America.

== Early life ==
Son of Capt. William J. Chandler and his wife Jamima Bradbury, Thomas Chandler was born at Woodstock, Connecticut in 1726, into a large family, with brothers William, Lemuel, Theophilus, Jemimah and Samuel and several sisters. He was educated at Yale College, where he joined the Church of England and came under the influence of Samuel Johnson and Timothy Cutler. In 1748, after teaching as discussed below, Chandler received a master's degree from Yale, and graduated alongside Samuel Seabury and future U.S. Senator William Samuel Johnson of New York, with whom he later often corresponded. His classmate's father, Rev. Samuel Johnson became his mentor as a clergyman, and Chandler later wrote a biography of the New York cleric that his own son-in-law published. In 1751, Chandler went to England orders in the Church of England. He received an honorary Master's degree from Oxford in 1753, and a Doctor of Divinity degree from there in 1767, and a Doctor of Divinity degree from King's College (now Columbia University) in 1767.

He married Jane Emott, and had a son, William Chandler, as well as daughters Mary Rickets Chandler, Elizabeth Chandler, Catherine Chandler Dayton, Jane Tongerlon Chandler and Mary Goodin Chandler. The last, his youngest daughter, married missionary priest John Henry Hobart, who, after his father-in-law's death, published his Life of Samuel Johnson, and himself became Bishop of the Episcopal Diocese of New York.

== Ministry ==
After his initial graduation in 1745, Chandler taught school while studying for the ministry. The Society for Propagating the Gospel in Foreign Parts (SPG) appointed him lay reader and catechist in New Jersey, as his mentor the Rev. Samuel Johnson was serving across the river in New York City. In 1747, Chandler succeeded the Rev. Edward Vaughan, who had died, as a mission priest in New Jersey, and made Elizabeth, New Jersey his base. Initially, New Jersey had been populated and governed under two different auspices. The southern portion was initially granted to William Penn and descendants, and was governed through Burlington, New Jersey, and less directly from Philadelphia. What was known as East Jersey was initially granted to Lord Carteret, but early in the 18th century bought by other Quakers. It was governed through Perth Amboy, but also had relations with the priests and garrison chaplains of New York City. In 1751, Chandler sailed to and from England, where he completed his studies and was ordained a priest by the Bishop of London (then responsible for priests in the American colonies) as well as installed as rector of St. John's church in Elizabeth, New Jersey.

Upon returning to New Jersey, Chandler became "one of the foremost men among the American clergy." He continued to work extensively with the SPG and became its bursar in North America. Chandler also corresponded extensively with fellow Anglicans in North America, including fellow Connecticut priest Samuel Seabury and Irish immigrant the Rev. Charles Inglis (rector of Trinity Church on Wall Street in New York City). Chandler wrote to England concerning the unwisdom of the Stamp Act in 1766 and the lack of wisdom of Parliament's measures for governing the colonies, and urged creation of a North American Episcopate.

Responding to an address by the Bishop of Gloucester to the SPG in 1766, Chandler published Appeal to the Public in Behalf of the Church of England in America in New York in 1767. This drew attacks from Congregational and Presbyterian Church members, as well as newspapers in New York, Philadelphia and Boston. Prominent Congregational clergyman Dr. Charles Chauncy published The Appeal Answered, to which Chandler responded with The Appeal Defended (1769) and The Appeal Further Defended (1771) after Chauncy's Compleat View of Episcopay continued to oppose creation of an Anglican bishopric in the American colonies. Inglis also published a pamphlet supporting a North American-based bishop. In 1771, American churchmen sent Dr. Myles Cooper (Johnson's successor at Columbia College) to England to lobby for better treatment of the colonial church. However, Chandler remained in the colony, and became involved in concluding the literary affairs of his mentor, who died in 1772.

When the American Revolutionary War broke out, Chandler's loyalties remained with England, and his eldest son William volunteered and became a Captain in Loyalist forces in October 1776. After threats from the local Sons of Liberty, Chandler sailed to England in May 1775, where he remained for nearly a decade (joining Cooper and joined Inglis in either 1777 and/or 1783). However, his daughter Catherine had married the son of Revolutionary General Elias Dayton (and brother of patriot lawyer Jonathan Dayton) and remained in New Jersey. In addition to his social activities on behalf of fellow Loyalists in England, Chandler also wrote pamphlets urging loyalty to England, which the Royal Printer printed and Loyalists distributed in the colonies. He also kept a diary which survives but was never published. While in England, Chandler continued to lobby for a bishop residing in North America. He facilitated contacts between non-Juror Dr. Cartwright, who helped negotiate the consecration of his fellow Loyalist and long-time friend Samuel Seabury by Scottish bishops led by the Rt. Rev. John Skinner in 1784.

In 1785, Chandler accepted his congregation's offer to return to New Jersey. However, a cancer developed on his face which prevented him from many official duties, although the vestry insisted that he remain their rector and live in the rectory even when incapacitated. In fact, the Church of England had offered to make Chandler the first Bishop of Nova Scotia, but he had declined in 1785. His Irish-born friend Charles Inglis thus became the first bishop of the Church of England in North America in 1787, with his seat in Nova Scotia. Despite his medical condition, Chandler continued to write, and the Memorial of the N.J. Convention, which Bishop William White believed Chandler wrote, was used to compile the declaration of intention and the formal creation of the Episcopal Church of the United States in 1789, as well as the authorized Preface of the standard Book of Common Prayer.

== Death and legacy ==
Chandler died at his home in what was then known as Elizabethtown in 1790. His widow and son-in-law Elias Bailey Dayton were executors and proved his will in 1794. His body was buried in the churchyard of St. John's Episcopal Church (Elizabeth, New Jersey). There is a memorial to him in the parish church of Alton Barnes, Wiltshire, England.

His son-in-law, John Henry Hobart, is remembered on the Episcopal church calendar on September 12.

== See also ==
- Episcopal Diocese of New Jersey
