= John van Wyhe =

British historian of science

John van Wyhe (born 1971), is a British historian of science, with a focus on Charles Darwin and Alfred Russel Wallace, at the National University of Singapore. He holds various academic and research positions, ranging from founder and director of The Complete Works of Charles Darwin Online, Scientific Associate, The Natural History Museum (London), a Fellow of the Linnean Society and a Member of the British Society for the History of Science. He has given more than 50 public lectures on Darwin in more than a dozen countries. He lectures and broadcasts on Darwin, evolution, science and religion and the history of science around the world. He also wrote The Darwin Experience, a biographical book about Charles Darwin.

Van Wyhe has an M.A. from University College London and a Ph.D. from the University of Cambridge. He accepted a Senior Research Fellowship at the National University of Singapore in 2002 where he both founded the Darwin Online project and edited the Science section of the Victorian Web.

A new edition of his 2008 biography of Darwin, Darwin: The Man, His Great Voyage, and His Theory of Evolution, appeared under the banner of the Natural History Museum in 2018.

== Research ==
For the Darwin bicentenary year of 2009, van Wyhe published four books on Darwin: Darwin's Shorter Publications; Darwin's Notebooks from the Voyage of the Beagle; Darwin in Cambridge; and an accessible biography: Darwin.

Recent projects include challenging the assumed view that Darwin held back or kept his theory secret for twenty years and restoring Darwin's student rooms at Christ's College, Cambridge.

In addition to maintaining Darwin Online, van Wyhe had an interest in the history of phrenology and has given talks on this in Britain, France, and Germany.

== Darwin and religion ==
One of van Wyhe's areas of research covers the reception of evolutionary ideas, and in an article titled "Darwin vs God?" he put forward the case that Darwin was neither an atheist nor was there a significant uproar of science and religion when The Origin of Species was published, though heterogeneity of opinion existed.

We often hear that when the Origin of Species was published there was a great outcry and an historic clash of science and religion. This is probably more fantasy than fact... The Victorian public that first read or read about the Origin of Species were, for the most part, not biblical literalists. For decades the most enlightened writers in the fields of science and religion had accepted that much of the Old Testament, and Genesis in particular, had to be read in a metaphorical sense... Darwin's theories inspired the whole gamut of reactions. Among the scientific community they ranged from contemptuous rejection to enthusiastic support... Other writers felt that Darwin's views were an attack on the role of a Creator in nature... Others, like the Reverend Charles Kingsley, felt differently. He wrote enthusiastically to Darwin about his theory... to religious thinkers of Kingsley's ilk, Darwin had uncovered a new law by which God governed the natural world. For such thinkers it was quite reasonable to reconcile Darwin's views with their religion... As the years passed and reviews and counter-reviews appeared, the fact of Darwinian evolution, the common descent of species became increasingly accepted... Yet... the other key Darwinian idea, natural selection, was much less welcome. As scientific, and non-scientific readers came increasingly to accept the Darwinian concept of common ancestry for species, the view that natural selection was the primary mechanism was often sidelined or rejected. Huxley welcomed the big picture of the evolution of life with open arms. yet natural selection - that aspect of the theory that made divine intervention unnecessary - he could not accept. Many suggested instead that the variations that natural selection picked out were themselves divinely guided or caused. The bottom line seemed to be - was there a meaning or intention behind how life changed?'

— 'Darwin vs God?', BBC History Magazine, volume 10, No 1, January 2009, p. 27-31.

== Selected works ==
- Darwin: A Companion. World Scientific. 2021.
- Charles Darwin: The Compact Guide. Welbecck, 2020.
- On the Origin of Species. With an introduction by John van Wyhe. 2020.
- Wanderlust: The Amazing Ida Pfeiffer, the First Female Tourist. NUS Press. 2019.
- Darwin: The Man, His Great Voyage, and His Theory of Evolution. (Andre Deutsch: UK 2018).
- The Annotated Malay Archipelago by Alfred Russel Wallace. Edited [annotated and introduced] by John van Wyhe, NUS Press, 2015.
- Charles Darwin in Cambridge: The Most Joyful Years. World Scientific Press, 2014.
- Dispelling the Darkness: Voyage in the Malay Archipelago and the Discovery of Evolution by Wallace and Darwin. World Scientific Press, 2013.
- Alfred Russel Wallace: Letters from the Malay Archipelago. Forward by Sir David Attenborough. Oxford University Press, 2013.
- Darwin. (Andre Deutsch: UK 2008, National Geographic: USA, 2009). [Translated into French and Spanish]
- Charles Darwin's Shorter Publications 1829-1883. [Foreword by Janet Browne and Jim Secord] (Cambridge University Press, 2009).
- Charles Darwin's Notebooks from the Voyage of the Beagle. [Foreword by Richard Darwin Keynes] (Cambridge University Press, forthcoming July 2009, with Gordon Chancellor and Kees Rookmaaker).
- Darwin in Cambridge (Cambridge: Christ's College: 2009).
- Phrenology and the Origins of Victorian Scientific Naturalism. Ashgate, 2004.
- Combe's Constitution of Man, and Nineteenth-Century Responses. 3 vols. By George Combe, edited by John van Wyhe, Thoemmes Press, 2004.
