= The Complete Works of Charles Darwin Online =

Online digital book library

Homepage

The Complete Work of Charles Darwin Online (or Darwin Online) is a freely-accessible website containing the complete print and manuscript works of Charles Darwin, as well as related supplementary material.

== Overview ==
Darwin Online is a research project and website based at the National University of Singapore. It aims to provide all available print and manuscript material except unpublished letters, which are being made available separately by the Darwin Correspondence Project. In addition Darwin Online includes the largest bibliographical list of Darwin's publications and the largest union catalogue of Darwin papers and manuscripts worldwide. The site also provides an extensive collection of related materials such as reviews of Darwin's books, descriptions of his Beagle specimens, obituaries and recollections and works cited or read by Darwin. There is also general history and commentary—some from published sources and some prepared for the project.

The project began in 2002 and first produced a pilot website, The writings of Charles Darwin on the web, which was replaced in October 2006 by the new website. The launch was widely reported, and the project has been widely reviewed by professional publications in biology, and librarianship.

The site contains at least one copy of all known Darwin publications, both as searchable text (98,000 pages) and full colour images (80,000 images). Most of this material was not previously available on the internet – or never even reproduced in any form. New items are still being found and added, along with further editions, translations and transcriptions of Darwin's handwritten papers. In April 2008 Darwin's private papers were launched. The event marked the largest release of new materials by and about Darwin ever published. The collection covers c. 20,000 items across c. 90,000 electronic images. One notable item is the Diary of Emma Darwin (1808–1896), Darwin's wife.

The site is accessible open access free of charge. It is copyrighted, with permission for non-commercial use.

== Sponsorship ==
The founder and Director, John van Wyhe, privately funded the project from 2002 to 2005. From 2005 to 2008 the project was sponsored by the United Kingdom Arts and Humanities Research Council. The principal grantees were John van Wyhe of Christ's College, University of Cambridge, who is the Director of the project; James Secord of the Department of History and Philosophy of Science, University of Cambridge and Janet Browne of the Wellcome Trust Centre for the History of Medicine, University College London were the principal investigators for the grant. The project is now supported by private donation.
