= Wandering Souls: Protestant Migrations in America, 1630–1865 =

2010 book by S. Scott Rohrer

- Cover
- Author: S. Scott Rohrer
- Language: English
- Subject: Religious migration, Protestantism in the United States
- Genre: Non-fiction
- Publisher: University of North Carolina Press
- Publication date: 2010
- Publication place: United States
- Pages: 328
- ISBN: 978-0-8078-3372-8

Wandering Souls: Protestant Migrations in America, 1630-1865 is a 2010 book by American historian S. Scott Rohrer. The work investigates the relationship between Protestantism and internal migration in the United States through eight case studies spanning from the Puritan settlement of Connecticut in the 1630s to the Mormon exodus to Utah in the 1840s and 1850s. Rohrer argues that religion and migration shared a symbiotic relationship, with religious motivations driving many Americans to relocate and migration in turn strengthening rather than weakening Protestant institutions. The study covers a range of groups including Puritans, Anglicans, Scotch-Irish Presbyterians, Moravians, Methodists, Seventh Day Baptists, German Inspirationists, and Latter-day Saints, proposing a model that distinguishes between migrations undertaken by individuals or families seeking spiritual and economic fulfillment and those led by churches or congregations in pursuit of religious utopias or escape from persecution.

== Summary ==
Rohrer documents internal migrations within the United States through eight case studies spanning from the colonial era to the Civil War, arguing that religion and mobility shared a symbiotic relationship in which each reinforced the other. The author challenges two prevailing assumptions in migration historiography: that internal migration had little connection to religion and was primarily motivated by land acquisition, and that westward movement weakened Protestantism and established churches in the East by scattering believers to frontiers with no organized religion.

The book is organized into three parts. The first section establishes a baseline through the story of Thomas Hooker, the Puritan minister who led congregants from Massachusetts to found Hartford, Connecticut, in 1636. The second section, titled "The Protestant Sojourner," studies migrations in which religious, cultural, and economic factors combined to propel individuals or families, with chapters on Anglican minister Devereux Jarratt's spiritual wanderings in Virginia, Scotch-Irish Presbyterian settlements in Maine and the Shenandoah Valley, Moravian families who moved to Wachovia in North Carolina, and Virginia Methodists who departed for Ohio due to antislavery sentiments. The final section, "Journeys of the Pure," addresses migrations driven by dissent, utopian aspirations, or persecution. Rohrer covers Seventh Day Baptists who left New Jersey for western Virginia, the Inspirationists who relocated from New York to Amana, Iowa, and the Mormons who went to Utah after the assassination of Joseph Smith.

In the Afterword, Rohrer identifies three main impulses underlying Protestant migrations: a search for salvation or spiritual rebirth, a desire to build godly communities, and an urge toward religious reform. He proposes a model sorting Protestant migrations into two basic types: individual or family movements seeking spiritual and economic fulfillment, and church-led migrations aimed at establishing religious utopias, escaping persecution, or resolving internal conflict.

== Critical reception ==
Thomas S. Kidd described the work as "ingeniously conceived" and praised its attempt to connect religion, economics, and migration on a broad scale. Kidd noted that while the author's command of the overarching themes of religious migration was impressive, specialists might find that individual accounts did not always break new ground.

Christopher E. Hendricks observed that the themes of religious migration presented were innovative, though he found the organization frustrating at times as each chapter began with a narrative hook before backtracking, often by centuries, to fill in historical background. Hendricks thought that the coverage seemed unbalanced, covering individuals in some chapters and entire denominations in others, and that the categorization did not always work well since many subjects could fit into both individual and community sections. Despite these caveats, Hendricks thought that the book "offers new insights into the quite complex role of religion in the history of American settlement and is well worth reading."

John Fea commended the book for bringing religion into scholarly discussions of the "peopling" of America. Fea found the suggestion that migration actually strengthened Protestant life in early America an idea worth exploring more fully, but he questioned whether the paradigm being challenged was "as ensconced in the literature" as the author seemed to suggest. Fea anticipated that some readers would not be convinced that religion was as strong a motivating factor for migration as was the quest for land, while others might argue that migration did indeed weaken the religious communities that were left behind.

In her review, Heather Clements thought that the author accomplished his overall purpose quite well and achieved a certain geographical and chronological balance. Clements noticed that greater attention to interactions with enslaved Africans, First Peoples, and African American Methodists could have further enhanced the case studies. She also praised the thorough use of available sources. Clement stated that the book established the importance of migration studies to scholars of early American religion, especially given that by 1810 "approximately one-third of all Americans lived somewhere other than where they had been born."

Timothy D. Hall considered the book as a counter to the dominant portrayal of westward migration as harmful to religious cohesion on the early American frontier. Hall thought that the author "clearly demonstrates that, for many migrants, religion remained a central reason for moving, and a vital force for preserving community in their new homes in the West."

Peter W. Williams described it as "engagingly written and provocative." Williams observed that while the narrative advanced, the author provided historical context on various groups and filled in details vividly.

In his review, Bret E. Carroll acknowledged that the taxonomies of migration types and motives enhanced understanding of these movements, but suggested that readers of church history were "unlikely to be surprised by his basic argument." Carroll found the stories of people relocating to lead the religious lives they desired had "an all-too-familiar ring," more evident in the closing chapter on the Mormon exodus. He identified the more significant contributions in suggestions calling for further investigation, though he thought that Rohrer appeared to simply add religious motives to existing migration theories without clarifying what made religious migrations fundamentally different from secular ones.

Hans Krabbendam found the work represented respectable scholarship and was well written, but judged that it fell short of its ambition to make a systematic contribution. Krabbendam suggested that a consistent categorization of religious groups on the basis of contents and practice, along with a comparison between groups and individuals with and without strong religious convictions, "would have added even more to the understanding of religion on the move." While the research was deft and the stories well told, Krabbendam found that the emphasis on diversity put efforts to find general patterns in the shade.
