= Samuel Longfellow =

American clergyman (1819–1892)

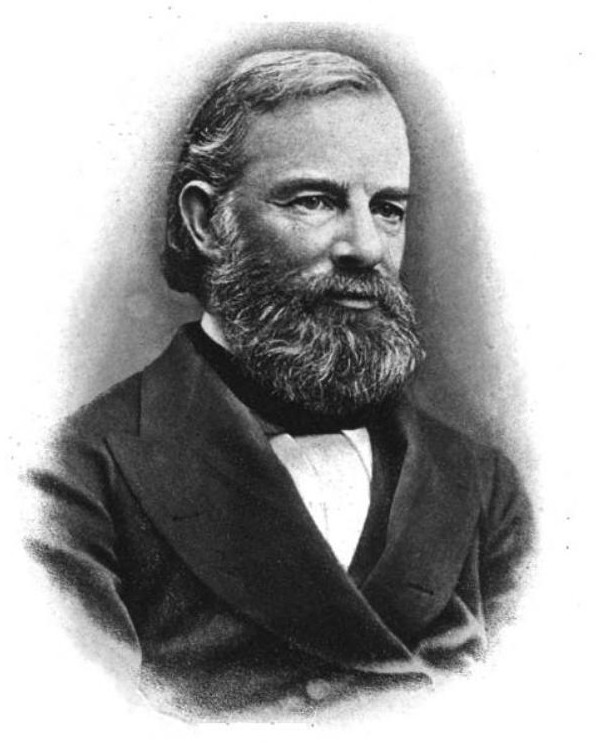
- Born: June 18, 1819; Portland, Maine, United States
- Died: October 3, 1892 (aged 73); Cape Elizabeth, Maine, United States
- Resting place: Western Cemetery, Portland, Maine, United States
- Education: Bowdoin College, Harvard Divinity School
- Occupations: Clergyman and hymn writer
- Parents: Stephen Longfellow; Zilpah Wadsworth
- Relatives: Henry Wadsworth Longfellow (brother)

Samuel Longfellow (June 18, 1819 – October 3, 1892) was an American clergyman and hymn writer.

== Biography ==
Samuel Longfellow was born June 18, 1819, in Portland, Maine, the last of eight children of Stephen and Zilpah (Wadsworth) Longfellow, the daughter of General Peleg Wadsworth. His older brother was the poet Henry Wadsworth Longfellow. He studied at Bowdoin College in 1833. He attended Portland Academy and then Harvard College, where he graduated in 1839 ranked eighth in a class of 61. He went on to study at Harvard Divinity School, where his classmates included Thomas Wentworth Higginson and Samuel Johnson, with whom he would later collaborate in his hymn writing.

He is considered part of the second-generation of transcendentalists; after becoming a Unitarian pastor, he adapted the transcendental philosophy he had encountered in divinity school into his hymns and sermons.

Longfellow served as a gym leader in Fall River, Massachusetts (1848), Brooklyn's Second Unitarian Church (1853), and Germantown, Pennsylvania (1878–1882). After his older brother's death, Longfellow published a two-volume biography of him in 1886. He wrote the book while living at his brother's former home, Craigie House in Cambridge, Massachusetts. In 1878, Longfellow was elected as a member to the American Philosophical Society.

His other publications include Final Memories of H. W. Longfellow (1887), Vespers (1859), A Book of Hymns and Tunes (1860, revised 1876) and, with Samuel Johnson, he edited A Book of Hymns for Public and Private Devotion (1846) and Hymns of the Spirit (1864). Longfellow died in 1892 and is buried in Western Cemetery in Portland's West End.

Longfellow was an abolitionist, pacifist, and supporter of women's rights.

== Personal life ==
Throughout his life Longfellow had romantic friendships with men, and struggled with his sexuality, writing in 1837 of one such companion, William Winter: "I don’t think I have made a greater sacrifice of inclination to a sense of duty - but not a hearty one - I was reluctant then; I have been sorry at times ever since. It was a strange infatuation. And yet after all my fears might we not have been happy together? I loved him, and think he liked me." In 1842 he met fellow Divinity student Samuel Johnson: of their long association, a friend wrote: "There existed for forty years an intimacy which could hardly have been understood by David and Jonathan.” Longfellow later served a friend and mentor to young men such as Morton Fullerton.

== Selected bibliography ==
- A Book of Hymns for Public and Private Devotion, 1846, edited with Samuel Johnson. The collection was enlarged and revised in 1860.
- Thalatta: a Book for the Seaside, with Thomas W. Higginson, 1853
- Vespers, 1859
- The Poem of Niagata, 1861
- Hymns of the Spirit, 1864 (jointly edited with Samuel Johnson)
- The Life of Henry Wadsworth Longfellow, 1886
- Memoir and Letters, 1894
