= John White Chadwick =

American writer and Unitarian clergyman (1840–1904)

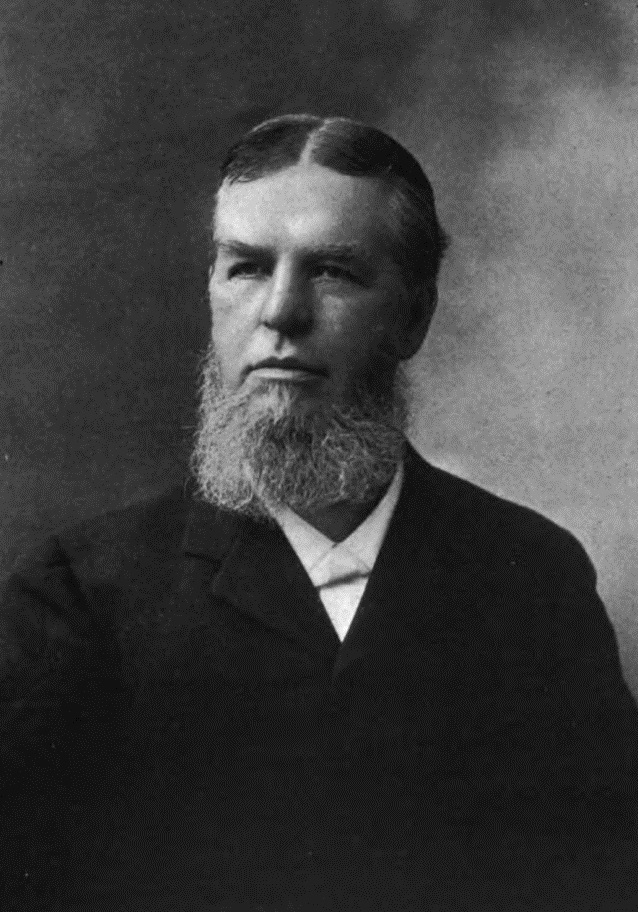
- Born: John White Chadwick; October 19, 1840; Marblehead, Mass., U.S.
- Died: December 11, 1904 (aged 64); Brooklyn, New York, U.S.
- Education: Harvard Divinity School
- Occupations: Clergyman, author, poet
- Spouse: Annie Horton Hathaway (m. 1865)
- Children: 1; John White Chadwick Jr.

John White Chadwick (October 19, 1840 – December 11, 1904) was an American writer and clergyman of the Unitarian Church.

== Early life and education ==
Chadwick was born in Marblehead, Massachusetts in 1840. He left school at age 13 and was apprenticed to a shoemaker for several years. In 1857 he opted to further his academic learning, and entered the State Normal School in Bridgewater, Massachusetts. After graduating in 1859, he attended Phillips Academy in Exeter, New Hampshire. By then he had chosen to become a minister, and enrolled in Harvard Divinity School. He graduated in July 1864. In December of that year, he was ordained and installed as minister of the Second Unitarian Church in Brooklyn, New York.

== Career ==
Chadwick's sermons attracted attention, and he developed a reputation as a radical preacher of Unitarian doctrines. His beliefs were in part shaped by his long friendship and correspondence with the radical Unitarian minister William Channing Gannett.

In 1876, Chadwick published his first book of poems and would continue to write poetry over subsequent decades. In 1885 he was elected Phi Beta Kappa poet at Harvard. For the occasion, he read his poem "A Legend of Good Poets". The following year he preached the alumni sermon at Harvard Divinity School. In 1888 he was awarded an honorary A.M. degree from Harvard.

He remained at the Second Unitarian Church until his death in Brooklyn on December 11, 1904.

== Works ==
In addition to contributing articles to Unitarian journals, Chadwick was a prolific author of books, producing over 30 in his lifetime. They consisted of his sermons and other theological writings (which were published in a series), historical and biographical monographs, and volumes of poetry. His best-known collection was titled A Book of Poems. First published in 1876, its tenth edition was released posthumously in 1905 by Little, Brown and Company.

His list of books include:

- Way, Truth, and Life: Sermons by N. A. Staples (Boston, 1870)
- The Great Salvation: A Sermon (New York, 1876)
- A Book of Poems (Boston, 1876)
- Thomas Paine: The Method and Value of His Religious Teachings (New York, 1877)
- The Bible of To-day (New York, 1878)
- The Faith of Reason: A Series of Discourses on Leading Topics of Religion (Boston, 1879)
- The State of the Nation: A Sermon (New York, 1879)
- Some Aspects of Religion (New York, 1879)
- An Educated Will (New York, 1881)
- The Man Jesus: A Course of Lectures (Boston, 1881)
- Belief and Life (New York, 1881)
- Origin and Destiny (Boston, 1883)
- In Nazareth Town, a Christmas Fantasy, and Other Poems (Boston, 1883)
- A Daring Faith (Boston, 1885)
- The Good Voices: Poems (New York, 1885)
- Birth and Triumph of Cupid, with verses by J.W.C. (New York, 1885)
- Gnostics and Agnostics: A Sermon (Boston, 1886)
- The Two Voices: Poems of the Mountains and the Sea (New York, 1886)
- The Revelation of God and Other Sermons (Boston, 1889)
- Charles Robert Darwin (Boston, 1889)
- Evolution and Social Reform (New York, 1890)
- The Power of an Endless Life and Other Sermons (Boston, 1891)
- Evolution as Related to Citizenship (New York, 1892)
- Seeing and Being and Other Sermons (Boston, 1893)
- George William Curtis: An Address by John White Chadwick (New York, 1893)
- Old and New Unitarian Belief (Boston, 1894)
- Power and Use (Boston, 1896)
- A Life For Liberty: Anti-Slavery and Other Letters of Sallie Holley (New York, 1899)
- Theodore Parker, Preacher and Reformer (Boston, 1900)
- Women of the Bible (New York, 1900)
- William Ellery Channing: Minister of Religion (New York, 1903)
- Later Poems, by John White Chadwick (Boston, 1905)
