= Samuel Johnson (clergyman) =

American clergyman and author (1822–1882)

Samuel Johnson (10 October 1822 – 19 February 1882) was an American clergyman and author.

== Biography ==
Johnson was born on 10 October 1822 in Salem, Massachusetts. He graduated from Harvard University in 1842, and from the Harvard Divinity School in 1846. He joined no religious denomination. Save for one year with a Unitarian church in Dorchester, Massachusetts, where he displeased his congregation by his opposition to slavery, he was not settled as a minister until 1853. In 1853, he established an independent society in Lynn, Massachusetts, with which he remained till 1870, when he withdrew to complete studies of many years, the results of which appeared later in his publications. He died on 19 February 1882 in North Andover, Massachusetts.

== Literary work ==
With Samuel Longfellow, Johnson compiled a Book of Hymns (1846) and Hymns of the Spirit (1864). Some of his own inspiring hymns in these books are now found in the collections of various denominations. His critical study The Worship of Jesus (1868), written in accordance with his views of universal religion, is described by O. B. Frothingham as “perhaps the most penetrating and uplifting essay on that subject in any language.” He printed notable essays on religion, reform, etc., in The Radical and other periodicals.

His great series Oriental Religions included volumes on India (1872), China (1877) and Persia (1885). The volume on Persia contains an introduction and a critical estimate of Johnson by Frothingham. The series represents what Johnson himself calls his “purely humanistic point of view.” It took its place among the most learned and liberal contributions to the study of comparative religion and civilisation. His philosophy was highly transcendental; but being versed in many languages, he was acquainted with all schools, and with the results of history, literature, science and criticism in every department.

Scholars have compared his competence, patience and thoroughness in writing Oriental Religions with the same qualities in Darwin. Prof. E. J. Eitel, the German orientalist, wrote of “Johnson's pre-eminent merits as the historian of universal religion,” and F. Max Müller paid him tribute as the finder of “a religion behind all religions.”

Johnson's Theodore Parker (1890) is a profoundly spiritual interpretation of that preacher and reformer, whose work on the intellectual side was surpassed by Johnson's, while on the moral side, as in the anti-slavery conflict, they stood as equal comrades. A little volume of Johnson's hymns, with other poems, was published in 1899.
