= Sir Thomas Barlow, 3rd Baronet =

Royal Navy officer

Commodore Sir Thomas Barlow Bt DSC DL
- Born: 23 January 1914
- Died: 12 October 2003 (aged 89)
- Military career
- Allegiance: United Kingdom
- Branch: Royal Navy
- Service years: 1935–1964
- Rank: Commodore
- Commands: HMNB Devonport (1962–64); HMS Supreme (1944–45); HMS Unison (1943); HMS United (1942); HMS L23 (1941–42)
- Conflicts: Second World War
- Awards: Distinguished Service Cross

Commodore Sir Thomas Erasmus Barlow, 3rd Baronet, DSC, DL (23 January 1914 – 12 October 2003) was an officer in the Royal Navy.

== Biography ==
Barlow was the eldest son of Sir Alan Barlow, 2nd Bt, and his wife Nora Darwin. His younger brother was the visual neuroscientist Horace Barlow. His maternal grandfather was Horace Darwin, and amongst his great-grandfathers were the naturalist Charles Darwin, the statistician and civil servant Thomas Farrer, 1st Baron Farrer, and the royal physician Sir Thomas Barlow.

After being educated at Winchester College, Barlow entered the Royal Navy in 1932 as a Cadet. He qualified on submarines in 1937 and during the Second World War served aboard submarines in the Atlantic, Mediterranean, Indian Ocean and Far East. His commands were:

- HMS L23 (13 Aug 1941 – 10 Jan 1942)
- HMS United (11 Jan 1942 – 7 Dec 1942)
- HMS Unison (20 Aug 1943 – 30 Nov 1943)
- HMS Supreme (15 Mar 1944 – Oct 1945)

In 1945 he was awarded the Distinguished Service Cross. He was promoted to commander in 1950 and captain in 1954, and was commodore of HMNB Devonport between 1962 and his retirement in 1964.

He married Isabel Body (1915–2005), daughter of the medical doctor Thomas Munn Body, on 9 July 1955 and they had four children:

- Sir James Alan Barlow, 4th Baronet (born 10 July 1956)
- Dr. Monica Anne Barlow (born 7 March 1958)
- Philip Thomas Barlow (born 31 December 1960)
- Teresa Mary Barlow (born 6 October 1963)

Barlow succeeded to the title of 3rd Baronet Barlow, of Wimpole Street, London on 28 February 1968, after the death of his father. He was appointed a Deputy Lieutenant of Buckinghamshire in 1976.

Barlow was also a conservationist and was a trustee of the Galapagos Conservation Trust.

Barlow was also a trustee for over 20 years of the Barlow Collection of Oriental art collected by his father. In 1997 Sir Thomas, along with his brother Erasmus Barlow were both awarded honorary Doctors of Letters degrees by the University of Sussex, who were bequeathed the Barlow Collection in 1968 on the death of Sir Alan

== Ancestry ==
Ancestors of Sir Thomas Barlow, 3rd Baronet

16. Thomas Barlow
8. James Barlow
17. Maria Smith
4. Sir Thomas Barlow, 1st Baronet
18. James Barnes
9. Alice Barnes
19. Nancy Butterfield
2. Sir Alan Barlow, 2nd Baronet
20. Adam Dalmahoy
10. Patrick Dalmahoy
21. Jean Carfrae
5. Ada Helen Dalmahoy
22. Simon Sawers
11. Anna Catherine Sawers
23. Mary Sibbald
1. Sir Thomas Barlow, 3rd Baronet
24. Robert Darwin
12. Charles Darwin
25. Susannah Wedgwood
6. Sir Horace Darwin
26. Josiah Wedgwood II
13. Emma Wedgwood
27. Elizabeth Allen
3. Nora Darwin
28. Thomas Farrer
14. Thomas Farrer, 1st Baron Farrer
29. Cecilia Willis
7. Hon. Ida Farrer
30. William Erskine
15. Frances Erskine
31. Maitland Mackintosh

Baronetage of the United Kingdom
Preceded by James Alan Noel Barlow	Baronet (of Wimpole Street); 1968–2003	Succeeded by James Alan Barlow
