= Erasmus Darwin Barlow =

British psychiatrist, physiologist and businessman

- Born: Erasmus Darwin Barlow; 15 April 1915; London, England
- Died: 2 August 2005 (aged 90)
- Parents: Alan Barlow (father); Nora Barlow (mother)

Erasmus Darwin Barlow (15 April 1915 – 2 August 2005) was a British psychiatrist, physiologist and businessman.

Born in London in 1915, he was the second son of Sir Alan Barlow, son of Sir Thomas Barlow, royal physician. His mother was Lady Nora Barlow, daughter of Sir Horace Darwin. He was a great-grandson of the naturalist Charles Darwin. Although Erasmus has been a common name in the family since the time of his great-great-great-grandfather Erasmus Darwin (and, in turn, since his ancestor Erasmus Earle), he was named after his mother's brother, his uncle Erasmus Darwin IV who was killed at the Second Battle of Ypres on 24 April, nine days after he was born. His elder brother was Commodore Sir Thomas Erasmus Barlow, a younger brother was Horace Barlow.

He was educated at Marlborough College, and Trinity College, Cambridge, where he studied medicine. He also studied at University College London. He married Brigit Ursula Hope Black (known as Biddy), daughter of the author Ladbroke Black in 1938. They had three children:

- Jeremy Barlow (b. 1939), flautist, music historian, and director of the Broadside Band, married Jane Marian Hollowood, and later Ruth Evelyn Savage
- Camilla Barlow (b. 1942), married Martin Christopher Mitcheson OBE, physician, and later Anthony Whitworth-Jones, director of Garsington Opera
- Phyllida Barlow (1944–2023), sculptor and professor of fine art at the Slade School of Fine Art in London, who married Fabian Benedict Peake, son of the artist Mervyn Peake.

Barlow was senior lecturer and honorary consultant in psychological medicine at St Thomas's Hospital Medical School (1951–66), vice chairman of the Mental Health Research Fund, and a member of the scientific staff of the MRC Department of Clinical Research, University College Hospital. He was chairman of the Bath Institute of Medical Engineering and an enthusiastic founding member of the Erasmus Darwin Foundation at Lichfield. He was also, at various times, chairman of the Cambridge Scientific Instrument Company (CIC) – the firm founded by his maternal grandfather, and a director of CIC Investment Holdings, deputy chairman of George Kent Ltd and a director of Group Investors Ltd.

Barlow published research papers in physiology and psychiatric medicine. He was a Founder Fellow of the Zoological Society of London and its Secretary between 1980 and 1982. In 2008 the society started the Erasmus Darwin Barlow Conservation Expeditions named in his honour.

Barlow was a trustee for over 20 years of the Barlow Collection of Oriental art collected by his father. In 1997 Barlow, along with his brother Sir Thomas Barlow, 3rd Baronet, was awarded an honorary Doctor of Letters degree by the University of Sussex, who were bequeathed the Barlow Collection in 1968 on the death of Sir Alan.

He became a Liveryman of the Worshipful Company of Scientific Instrument Makers in 1965 and was Master for 1976-77.

Barlow died in Cambridge from renal failure in 2005.

== Selected publications ==
- Barlow, E.D.; Pochin, E.E. (1948). "Slow recovery from ischaemia in human nerves". Clinical Science. 6 (44): 303–317. PMID 18904140.
- Barlow, E.D.; Howarth, S. (1953). "Effects on blood pressure of ventricular asystole during Stokes-Adams attacks and acetylcholine injections". Br Med J. 2 (4841): 863–864. doi:10.1136/bmj.2.4841.863. PMC 2029867. PMID 13094039.
- Sharpey-Schafer, E.P.; Hayter, C.J.; Barlow, E.D. (1958). "Mechanism of acute hypotension from fear or nausea". Br Med J. 2 (5101): 878–80. doi:10.1136/bmj.2.5101.878. PMC 2026809. PMID 13572932.
- Barlow, E.D.; de Wardener, H.E. (April 1959). "Compulsive water drinking". QJM: An International Journal of Medicine. 28 (110): 235–258. doi:10.1093/oxfordjournals.qjmed.a066843. PMID 13658352.

Professional and academic associations
Preceded by Ron Hedley	Secretary of the Zoological Society of London; 1980–1982	Succeeded by John Guest Phillips
