= Ruth Darwin =

British psychiatrist (1883–1972)

- Born: 20 August 1883
- Died: 15 October 1972 (aged 89)
- Known for: Eugenics activism
- Board member of: Board of Control for Lunacy and Mental Deficiency
- Spouse: William Rees-Thomas (m. 1948)
- Parent(s): Sir Horace Darwin; The Hon. Ida Farrer
- Family: Darwin–Wedgwood family
- Awards: CBE (1938)

Ruth Frances Darwin CBE (20 August 1883 – 15 October 1972) was Commissioner of the Board of Control for Lunacy and Mental Deficiency and an advocate of eugenics.

== Career ==
Darwin was appointed to the Board of Control, as an unpaid member, in 1921, replacing Ellen Pinsent. She retired from the Board of Control in 1949.

In 1929, with money from the estate of her father who had died in 1928, she founded the Darwin Trust to foster research into "mental defect, disease or disorder".

In 1932 she was appointed to the Brock Committee (a Parliamentary committee chaired by Sir Laurence Brock) that produced the Brock Report that called for the forced sterilisation of "mental defectives".

She was appointed a CBE in 1938.

== Family connections ==
Darwin was the middle child and elder daughter of Sir Horace Darwin, through whom she was a granddaughter of the naturalist Charles Darwin (she was born a year after Charles's death in 1882). Her mother, The Hon. Ida Farrer (1854–1946), was the daughter of Thomas Farrer, 1st Baron Farrer. Her younger sister Nora, later became Lady Barlow after marrying Sir Alan Barlow, 2nd Baronet, while her elder brother Erasmus was killed during the Second Battle of Ypres in 1915.

In 1948, she married the Welsh psychiatrist William Rees-Thomas, who was a colleague of hers on the Board of Control. She died in 1972, predeceasing her husband.
