= Re Barlow's Will Trusts =

English trusts law case

Re Barlow’s Will Trusts
- Court: High Court
- Citation: [1979] 1 WLR 278

Case opinions
- Browne-Wilkinson J

Keywords
- Certainty, express trusts

Re Barlow's Will Trusts [1979] 1 WLR 278 is an English trusts law case, concerning certainty of the words "family" and "friends" in a will.

== Facts ==
Miss Helen Alice Dorothy Barlow, the testatrix had a large collection of pictures. She specifically bequeathed some. For the remainder, she declared them to be held by her executor on trust to sell them, but that her ‘family and friends’ could buy them first at 1970 valuations or at the probate value, whichever was lower. The proceeds would go to the residuary estate. The executors asked the court whether the direction about family and friends was void, given its uncertainty, and if it was valid, who the family and friends were.

== Judgment ==
Browne-Wilkinson J held that the trust was valid, because both concepts of friends and family could be given a workable meaning. Although ‘friend’ could have a wide variety of meaning, the minimum requirements were that (a) the relationship had to be long standing (b) be a social and not a business or professional relationship, and (c) although they may not have met for some time, when circumstances allowed, they would meet frequently. The word ‘family’ could be construed as any ‘blood relation’, and the only reason in other cases to restrict the concept to statutory next of kin had been to save gifts from failing for uncertainty.

The main questions which arise for my decision are (a) whether the direction to allow members of the family and friends to purchase the pictures is void for uncertainty since the meaning of the word “friends” is too vague to be given legal effect; and (b) what persons are to be treated as being members of the testatrix's family. I will deal first with the question of uncertainty.

Those arguing against the validity of the gift in favour of the friends contend that, in the absence of any guidance from the testatrix, the question “Who were her friends?” is incapable of being answered. The word is said to be “conceptually uncertain” since there are so many different degrees of friendship and it is impossible to say which degree the testatrix had in mind. In support of this argument they rely on Lord Upjohn's remarks in In re Gulbenkian's Settlements [1970] A.C. 508, and the decision of the House of Lords in In re Baden's Deed Trusts [1971] A.C. 424, to the effect that it must be possible to say who is within and who without the class of friends. They say that since the testatrix intended all her friends to have the opportunity to acquire a picture, it is necessary to be able to ascertain with certainty all the members of that class.

Mr. Shillingford, who argued in favour of the validity of the gift, contended that the test laid down in the Gulbenkian and Baden cases was not applicable to this case; the test, he says, is that laid down by the Court of Appeal in In re Allen, decd. [1953] Ch. 810, as appropriate in cases where the validity of a condition precedent or description is in issue, namely, that the gift is valid if it is possible to say of one or more persons that he or they undoubtedly qualify even though it may be difficult to say of others whether or not they qualify.

The distinction between the Gulbenkian test and the In re Allen test is, in my judgment, well exemplified by the word “friends.” The word has a great range of meanings; indeed, its exact meaning probably varies slightly from person to person. Some would include only those with whom they had been on intimate terms over a long period; others would include acquaintances whom they liked. Some would include people with whom their relationship was primarily one of business; others would not. Indeed, many people, if asked to draw up a complete list of their friends, would probably have some difficulty in deciding whether certain of the people they knew were really “friends” as opposed to “acquaintances.” Therefore, il the nature of the gift was such that it was legally necessary to draw up a complete list of “friends” of the testatrix, or to be able to say of any person that “he is not a friend,” the whole gift would probably fail even as to those who, by any conceivable test, were friends.

But in the case of a gift of a kind which does not require one to establish all the members of the class (e.g. “a gift of £10 to each of my friends”), it may be possible to say of some people that on any test, they qualify. Thus in In re Allen, decd . at p. 817, Sir Raymond Evershed M.R. took the example of a gift to X “if he is a tall man”; a man 6 ft. 6 ins. tall could be said on any reasonable basis to satisfy the test, although it might be impossible to say whether a man, say, 5 ft. 10 ins. high satisfied the requirement. So in this case, in my judgment, there are acquaintances of a kind so close that, on any reasonable basis, anyone would treat them as being “friends.” Therefore, by allowing the disposition to take effect in their favour, one would certainly be giving effect to part of the testatrix's intention even though as to others it is impossible to say whether or not they satisfy the test.

In by judgment, it is clear that Lord Upjohn in In re Gulbenkian's Settlements [1970] A.C. 508 was considering only cases where it was necessary to establish all the members of the class. He makes it clear, at p. 524, that the reason for the rule is that in a gift which requires one to establish all the members of the class (e.g. “a gift to my friends in equal shares”) you cannot hold the gift good in part, since the quantum of each friend's share depends on how many friends there are. So all persons intended to benefit by the donor must be ascertained if any effect is to be given to the gift. In my judgment, the adoption of Lord Upjohn's test by the House of Lords in the Baden case is based on the same reasoning, even though in that case the House of Lords held that it was only necessary to be able to survey the class of objects of a power of appointment and not to establish who all the members are.

But such reasoning has no application to a case where there is a condition or description attached to one or more individual gifts; in such cases, uncertainty as to some other persons who may have been intended to take does not in any way affect the quantum of the gift to persons who undoubtedly possess the qualification. Hence, in my judgment, the different test laid down in In re Allen, decd. [1953] Ch. 810 .

The recent decision of the Court of Appeal in In re Tuck's Settlements Trusts [1978] Ch. 49 establishes that the test in In re Allen is still the appropriate test in considering such gifts, notwithstanding the Gulbenkian and Baden decisions: see per Lord Russell of Killowen at p. 65.

Accordingly, in my judgment, the proper result in this case depends on whether the disposition in clause 5 (a) is properly to be regarded as a series of individual gifts to persons answering the description “friend” (in which case it will be valid), or a gift which requires the whole class of friends to be established (in which case it will probably fail).

The effect of clause 5 (a) is to confer on friends of the testatrix a series of options to purchase. Although it is obviously desirable as a practical matter that steps should be taken to inform those entitled to the options of their rights, it is common ground that there is no legal necessity to do so. Therefore, each person coming forward to exercise the option has to prove that he is a friend; it is not legally necessary, in my judgment, to discover who all the friends are. In order to decide whether an individual is entitled to purchase, all that is required is that the executors should be able to say of that individual whether he has proved that he is a friend. The word “friend,” therefore, is a description or qualification of the option holder.

It was suggested that by allowing undoubted friends to take I would be altering the testatrix's intentions. It is said that she intended all her friends to have a chance to buy any given picture, and since some people she might have regarded as friends will not be able to apply, the number of competitors for that picture will be reduced. This may be so; but I cannot regard this factor as making it legally necessary to establish the whole class of friends. The testatrix's intention was that a friend should acquire a picture. My decision gives effect to that intention.

I therefore hold that the disposition does not fail for uncertainty, but that anyone who can prove that by any reasonable test he or she must have been a friend of the testatrix is entitled to exercise the option. Without seeking to lay down any exhaustive definition of such test, it may be helpful if I indicate certain minimum requirements: (a) the relationship must have been a long-standing one. (b) The relationship must have been a social relationship as opposed to a business or professional relationship. (c) Although there may have been long periods when circumstances prevented the testatrix and the applicant from meeting, when circumstances did permit they must have met frequently. If in any case the executors entertain any real doubt whether an applicant qualifies, they can apply to the court to decide the issue.

Finally on this aspect of the case I should notice two further cases to which I was referred. The first is In re Gibbard's Will Trusts [1967] 1 W.L.R. 42 in which Plowman J. upheld the validity of a power to appoint to “any of my old friends.” It is not necessary for me to decide whether that decision is still good law, in that it applied the In re Allen test to powers of appointment. But it does show that, if the In re Allen test is the correct test, the word “friends” is not too uncertain to be given effect. Secondly, in In re Lloyd's Trust Instruments (unreported), June 24, 1970, but extracts from which are to be found in Brown v Gould [1972] Ch. 53, 56–57, Megarry J. stated, at p. 57:

“If there is a trust for ‘my old friends,’ all concerned are faced with uncertainty as to the concept or idea enshrined in those words. It may not be difficult to resolve that ‘old’ means not ‘aged’ but ‘of long standing’; but then there is the question of how long is ‘long.’ Friendship, too, is a concept with almost infinite shades of meaning. Where the concept is uncertain, the gift is void. Where the concept is certain, then mere difficulty in tracing and discovering those who are entitled normally does not invalidate the gift.”

The extract that I have read itself shows that Megarry J. was considering a trust for “my old friends” (which required the whole class to be ascertained) and not such a case as I have to deal with. In my judgment, that dictum was not intended to apply to such a case as I have before me.

I turn now to the question who are to be treated as “members of my family.” It is not suggested that this class is too uncertain. The contest is between those who say that only the next of kin of the testatrix are entitled, and those who say that everyone related by blood to the testatrix are included.

The testatrix was unmarried, therefore the word “family” cannot refer to her descendants. She had two brothers, Sir James and Sir Thomas Barlow, who survived to adulthood, a brother who died without issue during World War I, and a sister who died in infancy. She was survived by eight nephews and nieces, 24 great nephews and nieces, and 14 great-great nephews and nieces. A number of these were infants. Her will includes a gift to a great niece (so described) who would not be one of her next of kin. No doubt there are very many more remote relations.

In the absence of issue, the prima facie meaning of “family” means “relations,” that is to say those related by blood. The context of the will may show that the testatrix had a special class in mind, but I can find no sufficient context in this will to find that the testatrix meant any narrower class to take. However, there is a rule of construction that limits gifts to relations to the statutory next of kin of the testator. The authorities clearly establish that the reason for this rule is that, unless such limitation is introduced, the gift would fail for uncertainty, it being impossible to establish all the persons who are related by blood, however remotely: see Jarman on Wills, 8th ed. (1951), p. 1621. That this is the reason for the rule is made abundantly clear by Jenkins L.J. in In re Gansloser's Will Trusts [1952] Ch. 30, 46–47, where he describes this need for limiting the class to next of kin as “justification for imputing a wholly conventional and artificial intention to the testator.”

In the case of a gift to “my relations in equal shares,” such an artificial construction is necessary to save the gift from failing for uncertainty. But for the same reasons as I have sought to give in dealing with the word “friends,” in this particular case the option to the members of the family would not in any event fail for uncertainty even if it included all the testatrix's blood relations; anyone seeking to exercise the option would have to prove simply that he had a blood relationship.

There being, therefore, no reason to give the words in this will an artificially limited meaning, I decline to do so. The fact that in the will the testatrix described a beneficiary as her great-niece strongly suggests that she regarded that beneficiary as a member of her family. Yet that great-niece is not one of her next of kin. Accordingly, the artificially limited construction would defeat the testatrix's intention. There being no need so to construe the clause in order to validate it, I hold that the word has its ordinary meaning and includes all persons related by blood to the testatrix.

== See also ==
- English trusts law
- Sir Thomas Barlow, 1st Baronet, Helen Barlow's father
