= Martin T. Barlow =

British mathematician (born 1953)

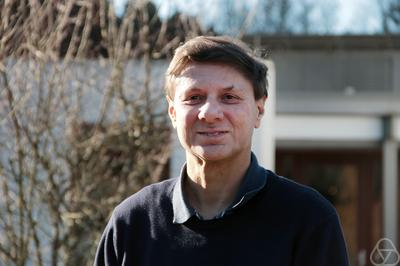
Barlow at Oberwolfach in 2016

Martin Thomas Barlow FRS FRSC (born 16 June 1953 in London) is a British mathematician who is professor of mathematics at the University of British Columbia in Canada since 1992.

== History ==
Barlow is the son of Andrew Dalmahoy Barlow (1916–2006) and his wife Yvonne. He is thus the grandson of Alan Barlow, and his wife Nora (née Darwin), through whom he is a great-great-grandson of Charles Darwin. He is the nephew of Horace Barlow (also FRS and Fellow of Trinity). In 1994 he married Colleen McLaughlin.

He was educated Sussex House School, St Paul's School, London, Trinity College, Cambridge (BA 1975, Diploma 1976, ScD 1993); University College of Swansea (PhD).

Barlow worked as a research fellow of the University of Liverpool 1978–1980. He was a Fellow of Trinity College, Cambridge, 1979–1992. He worked in the Statistical Laboratory, University of Cambridge 1981–1985 and was a Royal Society University Research Fellow 1985–1992.

== Work ==
His mathematical interests include probability, Brownian motion and fractal sets.

His doctoral students include Steven N. Evans.

== Recognition ==
He was awarded the Rollo Davidson Prize in 1984. He was elected a Fellow of the Royal Society of Canada in 1998. He was elected a Fellow of the Royal Society in 2005. In 2012 he became a fellow of the American Mathematical Society. In 2018 the Canadian Mathematical Society listed him in their inaugural class of fellows.

== Bibliography ==
- 'BARLOW, Prof. Martin Thomas', Who's Who 2011, A & C Black, 2011; online edn, Oxford University Press, Dec 2010; online edn, Oct 2010 accessed 21 May 2011
