= Barlow baronets of Wimpole Street (1902) =

Escutcheon of the Barlow baronets of Wimpole Street

The Barlow baronetcy, of Wimpole Street in St Marylebone in the County of London, was created in the Baronetage of the United Kingdom on 20 February 1902 for the physician Thomas Barlow. He was succeeded by his eldest son Alan Barlow, the second Baronet, who was a prominent civil servant. Commodore Sir Thomas Erasmus Barlow, DSC DT took the title in 1968. On his death in 2003 the title was passed to the fourth Baronet, Sir James Alan Barlow.

== Barlow baronets, of Wimpole Street (1902) ==
- Sir Thomas Barlow, 1st Baronet (1845–1945)
- Sir (James) Alan Noel Barlow, 2nd Baronet (1881–1968)
- Sir Thomas Erasmus Barlow, 3rd Baronet (1914–2003)
- Sir James Alan Barlow, 4th Baronet (born 1956))

The heir presumptive is Philip Thomas Barlow (born 1960), younger brother of the present holder. His heir apparent is his only son, Joshua Samuel Barlow (born 1996).

== Notes ==
Baronetage of the United Kingdom
Preceded by Green baronets	Barlow baronets of Wimpole Street; 20 February 1902	Succeeded by Bradford baronets
