= Church baronets =

Extinct baronetcy in the Baronetage of the United Kingdom

The Church baronetcy, of Woodside in the Parish of Bishop's Hatfield in the County of Hertford, of Belshill in the Parish of Bamborough in the County of Northumberland, and of Harley Street in the Borough of Saint Marylebone in the County of London, was a title in the Baronetage of the United Kingdom. It was created on 28 June 1901 for William Selby Church, President of the Royal College of Physicians from 1899 to 1905. Sir William was further honoured when he was appointed a Knight Commander of the Order of the Bath (KCB) in 1902.

The 2nd Baronet was awarded the Military Cross in 1918, and was appointed a Commander of the Order of the British Empire (CBE) in 1940. Sir Geoffrey was appointed an additional Aide de Camp to King George VI in 1941.

The title became extinct on the death of the 2nd Baronet in 1979, leaving no heir.

== Church baronets, of Woodside, Belshill and Harley Street (1901) ==
- Sir William Selby Church, 1st Baronet (1837–1928)
- Sir Geoffrey Selby Church, 2nd Baronet (1887–1979)

Baronetage of the United Kingdom
Preceded by Portal baronets	Church baronets of Woodside, Belshill and Harley Street; 28 June 1901	Succeeded by Green baronets
