= Brock Report =

1934 British Parliamentary report advocating for the sterilisation of disabled people

The Brock Report or Report of the Departmental Committee on Sterilisation (1934) was a British Parliamentary report advocating for the sterilisation of disabled people.

== Context ==
In late 19th and early 20th century Britain, supporters of eugenic ideas sought to promote breeding by those they considered "fit" and control the reproduction of those they considered to be "unfit". In the United Kingdom, prominent people from different political parties and backgrounds in arts and science supported eugenic ideas and aimed to have them made into law. The Eugenics Society saw voluntary sterilisation as a key issue and campaigned hard for it to be introduced into law. Desmond King and Randall Hansen have noted that the effort to promote eugenicist ideas was driven by a privileged minority rather than electoral support.

Disabled people were often targeted as "unfit". The Idiots Act 1886 and the Mental Deficiency Act 1913 defined categories of mental disability and controlled the treatment of mentally disabled people. The Mental Deficiency Act 1913 and a prior 1912 private members' bill called the "Feeble-Minded Control Bill" rejected sterilisation but included segregation, though paragraph (e) of a draft of the bill specifically proposed to confine those "in whose case it is considered desirable in the interests of the community that they should be deprived of the opportunity of procreating children".

In 1924, the Wood Committee was created to investigate the number of "mental defectives". The committee included eugenicists. It reported in 1929 that deficiency was increasing and defined categories of people.

In 1931, Archibald Church, a Labour MP, introduced a Sterilisation Bill to the House of Commons. Carlos Blacker campaigned to support the Bill but it was defeated with 167 votes against and 89 in favour. Those against the bill said it was anti-working class.

A departmental committee on sterilisation was established soon afterwards.

== Committee and evidence ==
The departmental committee on sterilisation was chaired by L.G. Brock, who was Chair of the Board of Control for Lunacy and Mental Deficiency. Its members included Wilfred Trotter, A.F. Tredgold, Ronald A. Fisher, Ruth Darwin, Ralph Henry Crowley, E.O. Lewis, E.W. Adams and Bertrand Dawson. F. Chanter was secretary. Crowley, Tredgold and Lewis had been involved in the earlier Wood Committee.

Brock was, by his own admission, biased in favour of eugenics from the outset and was given power to select the committee, thus shaping its views.

The committee heard evidence from 60 witnesses and held 36 meetings to consider this and evidence from reports and statistics. Of the 60 witnesses interviewed by the committee, only 3 were opposed in principle to the idea of sterilising people who were mentally disabled.

A London County Council survey into inheritance of "defect" was an influential piece of evidence considered by the committee.

== Report ==
The Report concluded that 'allowing and even encouraging mentally defective and mentally disordered patients' to be sterilised was a desirable approach, and that the scope of sterilisation should also be extended to people with physical disabilities. Its conclusions were described as the "unanimous" view of the committee.

The report was vague about who would be considered for sterilisation or how consent would be obtained. It neglected to account for evidence that environment shaped mental health.

== Responses and impact ==
The Eugenics Society praised the Report and the Minister for Health, Sir Hilton Young, sought support for a motion on sterilisation. Municipal Corporations, the Mental Hospitals' Association, and County Councils' Association created a draft Bill that had support from professional organisations. Herbert Ritchie Spencer, Charles Oliver Hawthorne and Philip Hamill opposed the Report, though the other 82 Fellows of the Royal College of Physicians who voted on it, including Walter Langdon-Brown, supported mass sterilisation as proposed.

But the Report did not win over doubters and Young refused to push the issue forward, concerned that there was a lack of voter support. The public, the British Medical Association, and the Catholic Church were in opposition, and a Royal Commission was not created.

Countries including Germany, Denmark, Canada and the United States, introduced sterilisation but the UK did not. The Nazi eugenic practices praised by the Report but then widely condemned during and after World War II made it impossible for the proposals to get support.

Historians Greta Jones and John MacNicol have argued that the Brock Report is evidence that there were limits to connections between 'progressive' thought and eugenics because the Labour Party blocked sterilisation measures they saw as anti-working class. The London County Council, newly under Labour control, voted against the Report, though the council's own survey was cited as evidence in support of sterilisation. However, historian Mathew Thompson argued that it is "too simplistic" to explain this as due to a shift to Labour control of the council. He notes that religion of constituents, as much as class issues, may have led to its rejection, and that doctors and women who were Labour members and sought more access to birth control were in favour of the report.
