= Sir William Church, 1st Baronet =

British physician

Sir William Church, 1st Baronet KCB
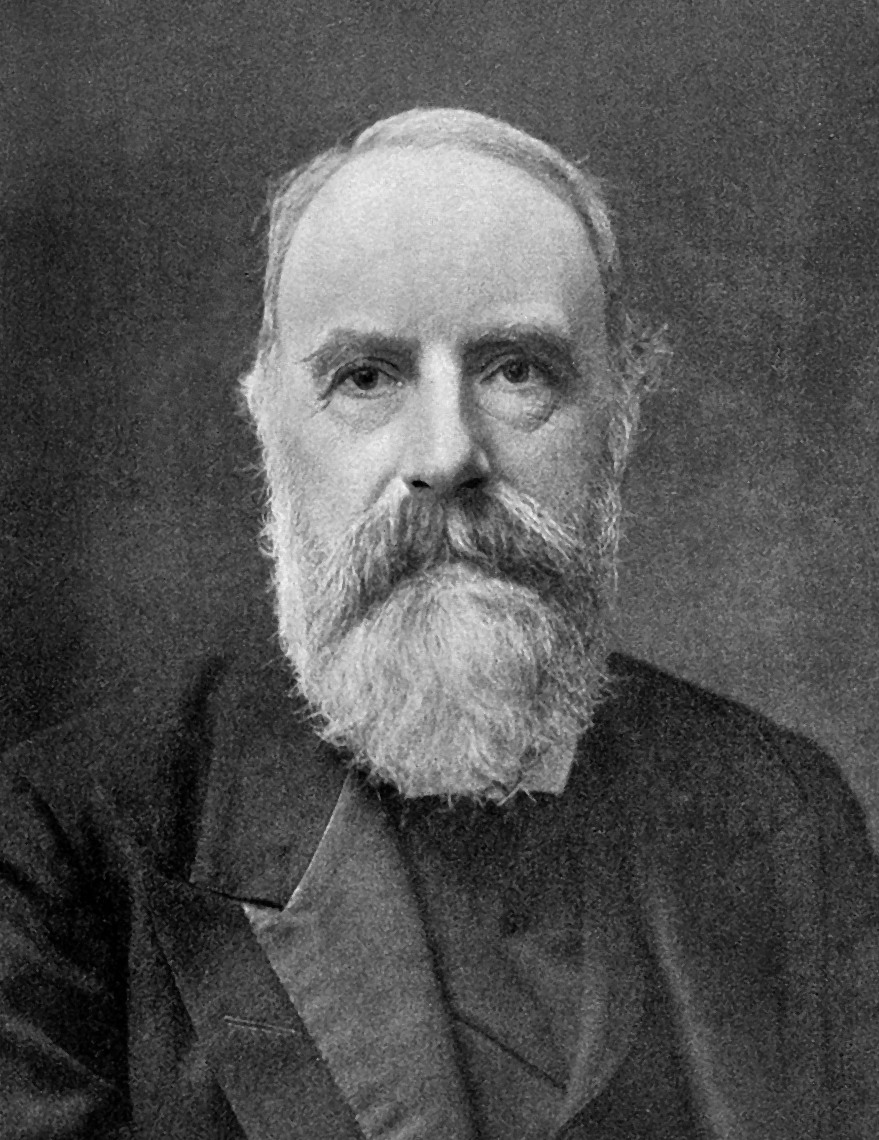
- Born: 4 December 1837
- Died: 28 April 1928 (aged 90)
- Education: Harrow School; Oxford University; St Bartholomew's Hospital
- Spouse: Sybil Constance Bigge

Sir William Selby Church, 1st Baronet, KCB (4 December 1837 – 28 April 1928) was a British physician to St Bartholomew's Hospital, president of the Royal College of Physicians from 1899 to 1905 and president of the Royal Society of Medicine from 1907 to 1909 and also in 1893 (having briefly served after the death of Sir Andrew Clark, 1st Baronet earlier that year). He is best remembered for his ability to direct policy of the associations he belonged to.

== Biography ==
Church was born in 1837, the son of John Church. He was educated at Harrow School, where he was captain of the cricket team and then went to Oxford University followed by a placement at St Bartholomew’s Hospital. He was appointed a Physician to the St Bartholomew's Hospital and to the Royal General Dispensary.

He was elected president of the Royal Medical and Chirurgical Society in 1893 to replace Sir Andrew Clark, who had died in office. He chaired the executive committee of the Imperial Cancer Research Fund from its beginning in 1902 until July 1923.

Church was created a baronet, of Woodside in the Parish of Bishop's Hatfield in the County of Hertford, of Belshill in the Parish of Bamborough in the County of Northumberland, and of Harley Street in the Borough of Saint Marylebone in the County of London, on 28 June 1901. He was appointed a Knight Commander of the Order of the Bath (KCB) in the 1902 Coronation Honours list published on 26 June 1902, and invested as such by King Edward VII at Buckingham Palace on 24 October 1902.

He received the honorary degree Doctor of Science (D.Sc.) from the Victoria University of Manchester in February 1902, in connection with the 50th jubilee celebrations of the establishment of the university. Two months later, in April 1902, he received the degree D.C.L. from the University of Durham.

From 1908 to 1910, he was elected president of the Royal Society of Medicine, which the Royal Medical and Chirurgical Society had become since his previous brief presidency in 1893. Church supported Sir William Osler in the founding of The History of Medicine Society at The Royal Society of Medicine, London in 1912.

== Family ==
Church married, in 1875, Sybil Constance Bigge, daughter of Charles J. Bigge. They had at least two sons, the eldest John William Church (b.1878) was killed in action in 1918, and he was succeeded as 2nd Baronet by his second son Geoffrey Selby Church (1887–1979).

Baronetage of the United Kingdom
| New creation | Baronet (of Woodside, Belshill and Harley Street); 1901–1928 | Succeeded by Geoffrey Church |
