= Frederick Willis =

Frederick Willis may refer to:

- Frederick Willis (American politician) (1904–1971), American politician in the Massachusetts House of Representatives
- Fred Willis (rugby league), Welsh rugby league footballer of the 1920s
- Frederick Willis (British Army officer) (1823–1899), British Army general
- Frederick Smythe Willis (1866–1910), British-born Australian municipal official; mayor of Willoughby, New South Wales
- Frederick Willis (civil servant) (1863–1946), English lawyer and civil servant
- Fred Willis (1947–2023), American football running back
- Fred Willis (communist) (1873–1947), English communist activist
