= S. J. Fraser MacLeod =

Simon John Fraser MacLeod KC (29 August 1857 – 7 September 1938) was a British barrister, commissioner to the Board of Control from 1913 to 1936.

He was the son of Inspector-General William MacLeod CB RN.
