= Ruth Padel =

British poet, novelist and non-fiction author

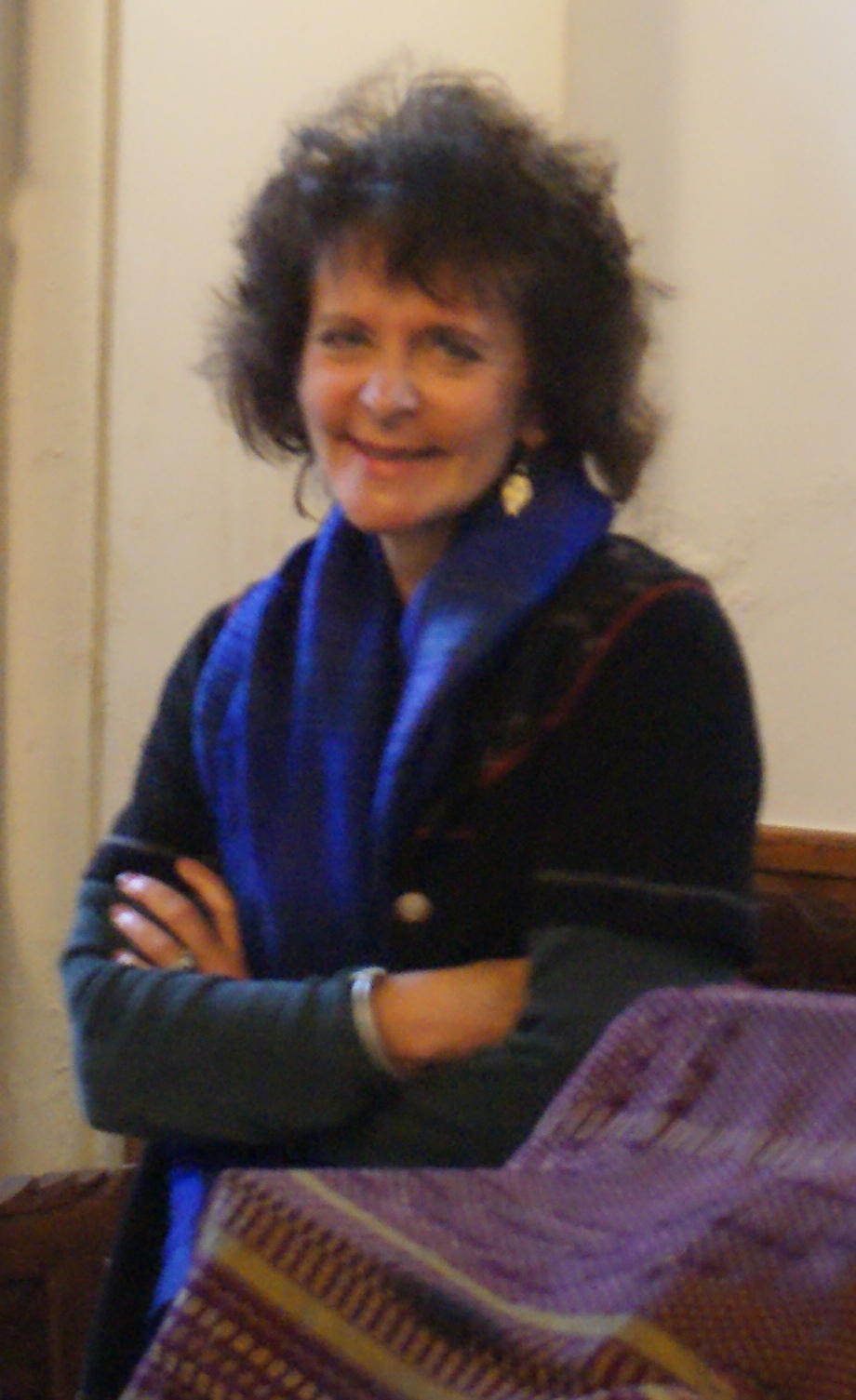
- Born: Ruth Sophia Padel; 8 May 1946 (age 80); Wimpole Street, London, England
- Occupations: Poet, author
- Parent(s): John Hunter Padel and Hilda Horatio Barlow
- Relatives: Charles Darwin (great-great-grandfather)

Academic background
- Education: University of Oxford; Sorbonne
- Website: http://www.ruthpadel.com

Ruth Sophia Padel FRSL FZS (born 8 May 1946) is a British poet, novelist and non-fiction author.

== Life ==
She studied Greek at the University of Oxford, where she sang in Schola Cantorum of Oxford, wrote a PhD thesis on ancient Greek poetry, and was a research fellow at Wadham College, which altered its statutes for her to allow female fellows. She taught Greek at Oxford, Cambridge and Birkbeck College, University of London, taught opera in the Modern Greek Department at Princeton University, and studied at the Sorbonne in Paris, where she sang in the Choir of Église Saint-Eustache, and at the British School of Archaeology at Athens, for which she helped excavate the Royal Road at Knossos. In 1984, she left academia to write, and published a poetry pamphlet and first collection.

She has served as trustee for Zoological Society of London and conservation charity New Networks for Nature, Chair of UK Poetry Society and Professor of Poetry, King's College London

=== Family ===
Her parents were psychoanalyst John Hunter Padel and Hilda Horatio Barlow, daughter of Sir Alan Barlow and Nora Darwin, granddaughter of Charles Darwin, through whom Padel is Darwin's great-great-grandchild.

== Work ==
=== Poetry ===
Padel has published thirteen poetry collections, won the UK National Poetry Competition, and been shortlisted five times for the T. S. Eliot Prize and other UK prizes. Major themes are music, science, nature and wildlife, painting, history, migration (animal and human), and women's place in the world, most recently exploring myths woven around girls, the links between girlhood and nature, and the misogyny girls face. Her work often focuses on the journey as a "stepping stone to lyrical reflection on the human condition". Padel's 1996 to 2004 collections, mixed passionate love lyric with wide adventuring across the globe, but also challenged the supremacy of the male gaze at women and offered the female gaze instead. Described as an exquisite image-maker and love poet of intense lyricism, delicate skill, deep resonance and a wild generous imagination, she went on to elegiac poems exploring loss and bereavement. A meditation on the colour green, written after her mother's death, "guides us around the world in intense flights of geological and geographical fancy, excavating the truths and mysteries of grief". Stylistic hallmarks are said to be juxtaposition of the modern world with the ancient, technical skill and musicality; wit, passion, lyrical intelligence, internal and half-rhyme, enjambement and unusual energy within and against the line, "As if Wallace Stevens had hijacked Sylvia Plath with a dash of punk Sappho thrown in." Quoted influences include Gerard Manley Hopkins and Greek choral lyric.

From 1998 to 2004, Padel's collections reflect themes of simultaneously written non-fiction: music (I'm a Man – Sex, Gods and Rock 'n' Roll); technical attention to the poetic line (52 Ways of Looking at a Poem, exemplified in poems such as "Icicles Round a Tree in Dumfrieshire" her National Poetry Competition winner); and wildlife (Tigers in Red Weather). Three later collections, Darwin – A Life in Poems and The Mara Crossing (now updated to We Are All From Somewhere Else 2020), include prose; Learning to Make an Oud in Nazareth (2014), with its resonant last line, "Making is our defence against the dark," has been called a meditation on conflict and history: especially of the Abrahamic religions. Tidings – A Christmas Journey addressed homelessness in her local London borough. Emerald (2018), a memoir and meditation on the poet's mother at her death, explored the alchemy of mourning and the renewing value of green. Her poetry biography of Beethoven, Beethoven Variations, was praised by the New York Times critic for taking him "deeper into Beethoven than many biographies I've read", and her portrayal of Beethoven early on "drifting into states that prefigured how deafness would increasingly isolate him." Girl (2024) is "A sensual exploration of female archetypes" and "a spiritual quest through ancient mythology, mysticism, European fairytales and memory" that reminds us "there is always the question of power / and girl is a trajectory / of learning how to deal with it".

==== Themes ====
===== Migration =====
Padel's collaboration with Syrian artist Issam Kourbaj, on Syrian refugees arriving on the Greek island of Lesbos, was performed on the first day of the Venice Biennale 2019.

Tidings – A Christmas Journey (2016), dedicated to the Focus Homeless Outreach Team in Camden, North London, is described as an eloquent unsentimental narrative poem exploring homelessness and the meanings of Christmas today: "...the rough, apparently unmanageable contrast between child and tramp, hope and despair, gives the book its integrity.

Padel's 2014 collection Learning to Make an Oud in Nazareth collects poems going back twelve years reflecting keen interest in the Middle East, from her prize-winning poem on Pieter Bruegel's "The Triumph of Death", the 2002 Siege of the Church of the Nativity in Bethlehem, to the title poem "Learning to Make an Oud in Nazareth", which she has stated came from hearing Le Trio Joubran. She has held dialogues with Palestinian poet Mourid Barghouti, and written an Introduction to the posthumous poems of Mahmoud Darwish. Learning to Make an Oud in Nazareth is said to have a "magnificent central section on the Crucifixion", and be steeped in the Middle East, Judaism, Christianity and Islam: "Padel is a poetic Daniel Barenboim, determined to arrive at some approximation of Middle Eastern harmony." Her innovative poems-and-prose volume The Mara Crossing (2012) revivified the prosimetrum, a medieval mix of poetry and prose, It addresses animal and human migration. and is described as a sweeping, experimental volume. Migrants, cellular, animal or human, migrate to survive; human migration is inextricable from trade, invasion, colonization and empire. "Home is where you start from, but where is a swallow's real home? And what does 'native' mean if the English Oak is an immigrant from Spain?"

One of Padel's poems was used by the "Making It Home" project of the Refugee Survival Trust in Glasgow, which used poetry-based film-making to build bridges between groups of women of refugees and local women in Edinburgh.

===== Darwin and Science =====
Engaged in relating poetry and science, Padel has written on cell migration for The Scientist, was a judge for the 2012 Wellcome Trust Science Book Prize and the 2005 Aventis Science Prize for the Royal Society has written poems on genetics and zoology, and her book on migration is said to connect micro-level cell migration with macro-level social migration. An interest in combining poetry, science and religion is reflected in poems on genetics, debates on poetry and prayer with Rowan Williams, Archbishop of Canterbury lectures at the Royal College of Surgeons and a residency at the Environment Institute, University College London.

Her poems on Charles Darwin (2009) employ Darwin's writings, letters and journals in an unusual form of biography, addressing his life, family and science. They were received as innovative work by scientists and by the literary community as a "new species" of biography in verse, whose emotional centre is the Darwins' marriage, shaken by divergent religious belief and the death of a daughter. The book's staging by the Mephisto Stage Company, Ireland, was described as intensifying the musicality of the verse and dramatic interplay between the scientific and the spiritual that permeates this collection. Since Padel is a Darwin descendant, the book was also a family memoir. Her preface illuminates the role of Padel’s grandmother, Nora Barlow, who in editing Darwin's Autobiography restored a passage in which Darwin said he did not see how anyone could wish the doctrine of hell to be true; this had been deleted by the first editor, Darwin's son Francis, at his mother's request. Padel's poems connected Darwin's loss of his mother as a child with his passion for collecting; and linked his early scientific writing with his taxidermy teacher in Edinburgh John Edmonstone, a freed slave from Guiana.

===== Music =====
Since 2013, Padel has written and performed sequences of poems on composers in conjunction with the Endellion String Quartet: first on Josef Haydn's Seven Last Words, which formed the central crucifixion section in her 2014 collection Learning to make an Oud in Nazareth; subsequently on Beethoven's late quartets and Schubert's Death and the Maiden. She was first Writer-in-Residence at the Royal Opera House Covent Garden and is said to be a lifelong choral singer; she has presented Radio 3's programme The Choir, has broadcast a series of BBC Radio 3 opera interval talks and has stated that if she could choose any other career it would be that of opera director. She has written on women's voices in opera and on a sixteenth-century madrigal for the London Review of Books, and in a Radio 3 essay series, Writers as Musicians, she spoke about playing viola, an instrument whose "inner voice" illustrates her Newcastle Poetry Lectures Silent Letters of the Alphabet. For BBC Radio 4, she has written and presented features on writers, scientists and composers, including Hans Christian Andersen, Edward Elgar, Charles Darwin and W. S. Gilbert.

On Desert Island Discs, her choices included Beethoven's String Quartet Opus 132, Verdi's Requiem, "Down by the Salley Gardens" sung by Kathleen Ferrier, "I'm Ready for You" sung by Muddy Waters, a Cretan folksong and "The Boys from Piraeus", from the film Never on Sunday. Her luxury was a herd of deer.

In 2020, Padel followed her 2009 poetry biography of Darwin with one of Beethoven, drawing on her musical childhood to create a poetry and prose mini-bio that "tells the great composer's life story more profoundly than most biographies". "A biography in verse of the great composer and a passionate highly personal account of how one creative genius can feed, and feed on, another." "An approach to Beethoven by way of precisely figured emotion. Two lives drawn beneath the lens, the composer's and her own, interacting in ways that can be bold and, finally, breathtaking. On the Eroica, she is spectacular. The composer is 'fire-dust, gold-flight /winching upwards into pure light' as he drives 'forward into a new-world dawn /thrilling with dissonance, calling up wild-steel angels'" (The Times Literary Supplement).

During the pandemic, Padel recorded four podcasts on Beethoven's life, illustrated by her poems, and music played by pianist Karl Lutchmayer, the Endellion Quartet, soprano Nina Kanter and the South Asian Symphony Orchestra, for the Bangalore International Centre.

=== Non-fiction ===
==== Greek scholarship, Greek myth, and rock music ====
Padel's non-fiction began with Princeton University Press studies of ancient Greek drama and the mind. In and Out of the Mind: Greek Images of the Tragic Self explores the way Greek ideas of inwardness shaped European notions of the self. She used anthropology and psychoanalysis to support her thesis that male Greek culture spoke of the mind as mainly "female" and receptive rather than "male" and active. Whom Gods Destroy: Elements of Madness in Greek and Other Tragedy investigates madness in tragedy from the Greeks to Shakespeare and the moderns, parsing different views of madness in different societies. She presented the tragic hero as embodiment of the human mind, "which lives catastrophe, suffers damage and endures".

Her 2000 study I'm A Man: Sex, Gods and Rock 'n' Roll argued that rock music began as a "wishing well of masculinity", which drew on mythic connections between male sexuality, aggression, anxiety, misogyny and violence which derived from Ancient Greece. Padel has stated that she intended this to focus on women's voices but then felt she ought first to pick apart the maleness of rock music. The book had a mixed reception from male reviewers. Women reviewers described it as original, beautifully expressed, vivid, amusing and convincing; Rock writers Charles Shaar Murray and Casper Llewellyn Smith described it as "provocative and fascinating" and her analysis of rock's misogyny "dazzling".

==== Nature, environment, wildlife, and conservation ====
Padel is known for her poetry and prose on conservation, especially of tigers. While serving as Trustee for the Zoological Society of London, she inaugurated an influential programme of ZSL Writers' Talks on Endangered Species to highlight the Zoological Society of London's conservation work. and is an Ambassador for New Networks for Nature, an alliance of practitioners in different fields, artistic and scientific, who celebrate Britain's nature and wildlife. Her account of wild tiger conservation, drawing on her scientific background and Darwinian descent, was valued internationally for quality of nature writing, insights on conservation, travel writing on little-known parts of the world such as Sumatra, Bhutan and Ussuriland, her ear for dialogue. and portrait of both the tiger and the field-zoologist. More recently, she has recorded "24 Splashes of Denial" – poems on water and climate denial - for Writers Rebel, and "Hormones, Divinity and Forest", her 2021 Memorial Lecture for Jane Harrison for Newnham College, Cambridge, united her early classical scholarship with contemporary environmental anxiety about the crisis in nature.

== Fiction ==
Padel's first novel Where the Serpent Lives (2010) focuses on nature, and also wildlife crime, mainly in India but also in Britain. It was praised for its vivid nature writing, intensely observed portrait of Indian forests and wildlife under threat, her innovative use of science and animal's eye viewpoint. 'Only Emily Brontë has embraced Padel’s radical and sympathetic inclusiveness of creaturely life.' 'She brings a poet’s intensity to her prose: objects, plants, and the wildlife that stalk her pages are all fiercely observed. Elephants and tigers under threat from poachers, forests felled for financial gain, corruption and uncaring officialdom result in habitats lost and species disappearing.' In India and UK, reviewers commented on the imaginative connections between nature, poetry and science. "She has done for the forests of Karnataka and Bengal what Amitav Ghosh did for the Sundarbans in The Hungry Tide." Her second novel, Daughters of the Labyrinth, set in London and Crete 2019-20, looks back to the Second World War and the little-known Holocaust of the Jews of Crete - where Padel has lived on and off since 1970. It also tells the story of the last synagogue on Crete, Etz Hayyim Synagogue in Chania. 'It is rare to come across literary fiction as satisfying as this. I had no idea there was a Jewish community on Crete or what had happened to them. Padel skilfully shows the lives of Cretan Jews deeply embedded in the island’s life, and, tragically, how cut off they were from what was happening to Jews on the Greek mainland. The whiff of authenticity seeps from every page,'(Jewish Chronicle). ‘An immersive novel steeped in the history and folklore of Crete: transporting, historically informative story-telling’(Sunday Times).‘Evocative, entrancing, a wonderfully rich and absorbing novel, delightful in its evocation of Crete and its many-layered history.’

== Criticism and teaching ==
From 1998 to 2001, she pioneered "The Sunday Poem", a weekly column in London's Independent on Sunday, in readings of contemporary poems she collected in her popular books 52 Ways of Looking at a Poem and The Poem and the Journey. As Chair of the UK Poetry Society 2004–2007, she presided over the establishment of poetry "Stanzas" across the UK.

In 2010, she chaired Judges for the Forward Poetry Prize, in 2011 delivered the Housman Lecture at the Hay Festival on "The Name and Nature of Poetry", and inaugurated Radio 4's Poetry Workshop, a series of programmes on writing poetry in which she led workshops with poetry groups across the UK. Her books on reading poetry and the column from which they grew influenced a decade of writing about poetry in the UK, followed by her Newcastle University "Bloodaxe" Lectures on poetry's use of silence, Silent Letters of the Alphabet. Her criticism is reported to employ close analysis, knowledge of Greek poetics, myth, metaphor, tone and rhyme; she is said to read with aural acuity, generosity and no polemic; her precision "does not obscure but builds the big picture", addressing the general reader but with "utmost attention to the page".

She has written introductions to the works of Palestinian poets Mahmoud Darwish, Mourid Barghouti and Ramsey Nasr, and British poets Walter Ralegh, Tennyson and Gerard Manley Hopkins. At the opening festival of the T. S. Eliot Festival at Little Gidding in 2006, 70 years after Eliot's visit there, Padel described the contrast between Eliot's memories of Little Gidding and his experience of The Blitz while writing the poem. "It reminded him there was still a place that had a sense of truth." She returned to this moment in her foreword to the posthumous volume of Mahmoud Darwish, comparing his sense of the poet's role in a time of violence to that of Seamus Heaney in Northern Ireland during the Troubles and of Eliot during the London blitz.

== Books ==
=== Fiction ===
- Where the Serpent Lives 2010
- Daughters of the Labyrinth 2021

=== Poetry ===
- Alibi, The Many Press, 1985
- Summer Snow, Hutchinson, 1990
- Angel, Bloodaxe Books 1993
- Fusewire, Chatto & Windus, 1996
- Rembrandt Would Have Loved You, Shortlisted for T. S. Eliot Prize, Chatto & Windus, 1998
- Voodoo Shop, Shortlisted for Whitbread Prize and T. S. Eliot Prize, Chatto & Windus, 2002
- The Soho Leopard, Shortlisted for T. S. Eliot Prize, Chatto & Windus, 2004
- Darwin – A Life in Poems, Shortlisted for Costa Prize, Chatto & Windus, A A Knopf, 2009
- The Mara Crossing, Shortlisted for Ted Hughes Award, Chatto & Windus, 2012
- Learning to Make an Oud in Nazareth, Shortlisted for T. S. Eliot Prize, Chatto & Windus, 2014
- Tidings – A Christmas Journey Chatto & Windus, 2016
- Emerald, Chatto & Windus, 2018
- Beethoven Variations: Poems on a Life, Chatto & Windus and A. A. Knopf, 2020
- We Are All from Somewhere Else (updated edition of The Mara Crossing) Vintage, 2020
- Watershed - poems on water and climate denial, Hazel Press, 2023
- Girl, Chatto & Windus, 2024, Poetry Book Society Special Commendation

=== Non-fiction ===
- In and Out of the Mind: Greek Images of the Tragic Self, 1992
- Whom Gods Destroy: Elements of Greek and Tragic Madness, 1995
- I'm a Man: Sex, Gods and Rock 'n' Roll, 2000
- Tigers in Red Weather, 2005

=== Criticism, and editing ===
- 52 Ways of Looking at a Poem: How Reading Modern Poetry Can Change Your Life, 2002
- The Poem and the Journey, 2006
- Silent Letters of the Alphabet, 2010
- Walter Ralegh, Selected Poems, 2010
- Alfred Lord Tennyson (Folio Society, Introduction and Notes), 2007
- Gerard Manley Hopkins (Folio Society, Introduction), 2011

== Awards and appointments ==
- 1992: Wingate Scholarship
- 1993: Angel Poetry Book Society Recommendation
- 1994: Arts Council Writers' Award for poetry collection Fusewire
- 1996: First Prize, UK National Poetry Competition
- 1996: Judge for T. S. Eliot Poetry Prize
- 1998: Rembrandt Would Have Loved You Poetry Book Society Choice, shortlisted for T. S. Eliot Prize
- 1998: Appointed Fellow of The Royal Society of Literature
- 1999: Judge for National Poetry Competition
- 2000: Cholmondeley Award from Society of Authors
- 2002: Poet in Residence for the Henry Wood Promenade Concerts in 2002.
- 2002: Voodoo Shop Poetry Book Society Recommendation, short-listed for T. S. Eliot Prize and Whitbread Poetry Award
- 2003 Research Award from Calouste Gulbenkian Foundation
- 2004: The Soho Leopard Poetry Book Society Choice, short-listed for the T. S. Eliot Prize
- 2005: Tigers in Red Weather shortlisted in USA for Kiriyama Prize and in UK for Dolman Best Travel Book Award
- 2005: Judge for Royal Society Aventis Prize for Science Books
- 2006: Arts Council of England Individual Writer’s Bursary
- 2008: First Writer in Residence at Somerset House, London
- 2008–2009: Inaugurated Writers' Talks at the Courtauld Institute of Art.
- 2009: Judge for National Poetry Competition
- 2009: Leverhulme Artist in Residence Award at Christ's College, Cambridge
- 2009: Opened Edinburgh International Book Festival reading from Darwin – A Life in Poems
- 2009: Elected Professor of Poetry at Oxford University
- 2009: British Council Darwin Now Award
- 2009: Read, talked on Darwin at University of Havana, Poetry Society of America in Lillian Vernon House, New York, and New York Botanical Garden.
- 2009: Darwin – A Life in Poems shortlisted for Costa Book Awards for poetry
- 2010: Read on conservation, nature and environment in Mumbai, at Bombay Natural History Society and Prithvi Theatre.
- 2010–2011: Writer in Residence at the Environment Institute, University College London
- 2010 Chair of Judges for Forward Poetry Prize
- 2010: Curated "Writing the Family" events for Edinburgh International Book Festival
- 2010: Judge for Poetry for 2010 Costa Book Awards
- 2011: Inaugurated 'Poetry Workshop' on BBC Radio 4
- 2012: The Mara Crossing nominated for London Poetry Awards and shortlisted for Ted Hughes Prize
- 2012: Judge for the 2012 Wellcome Trust Science Book Prize.
- 2013: Appointed to teach Creative Writing, King's College London
- 2014: First Writer in Residence, Royal Opera House, Covent Garden
- 2014: Learning to Make an Oud in Nazareth shortlisted for T. S. Eliot Prize
- 2015: Performed at Jaipur Literary Festival
- 2015: Read at International Literature Festival Berlin
- 2016: Judge for International Man Booker Prize
- 2016: Chair of Judges for T. S. Eliot Prize
- 2016: Performed at Times of India Festival Mumbai
- 2016: Performed Tidings – A Christmas Journey at Ely, in conversation with former Archbishop of Canterbury Rowan Williams
- 2016: Performed Tidings in the Round Church Holy Sepulchre, Cambridge, in the Cambridge Literary Festival
- 2017: Performed at Jaipur Literature Festival
- 2019: Inaugurated Jaipur Literary Festival with two poems, on Jaipur and on the world's first cell

== Oxford Professor of Poetry ==
In 2009, Padel became the first woman to be elected Oxford Professor of Poetry but a media storm broke out when photocopied pages from a university publication, detailing sexual harassment charges at Harvard and Boston universities against rival Derek Walcott, were sent anonymously to Oxford voters. Walcott withdrew his candidacy. Padel denied connection with these pages but media commentators alleged her involvement; she resigned, saying she did not wish to do the job under suspicion. Public comment attributed treatment of Padel to misogyny, and "toxic media pursuing allegations against Walcott while denigrating Padel, justly held in high regard for her poetry and teaching, for mentioning these as a source of disquiet" and pointing out that she had mentioned information in the public domain, not rumours. "Oxford missed out for the worst of reasons on an inspirational teacher; Walcott removed the decision from the electorate by his own choice; Padel should not have been made to pay for his decision to confront neither his accusers nor his past." On Newsnight Review, poet Simon Armitage, elected to the Chair in 2016, expressed regret at her resignation: "Ruth's a good person. I don't think she should have resigned; she would have been good."
