= Anthony Whitworth-Jones =

- Born: 1 September 1945; Gerrards Cross, Buckinghamshire, England
- Occupation: Opera manager
- Spouse: Camilla Barlow
- Relatives: Erasmus Darwin Barlow (father-in-law)

Anthony Whitworth-Jones (born 1 September 1945) is an opera manager.

== Early life ==
Anthony Whitworth-Jones was born on 1 September 1945 in Gerrards Cross, Buckinghamshire, U.K. He is the son of Henry Whitworth-Jones and Patience Martin.

== Career ==
Whitworth-Jones became a chartered accountant.

Whitworth-Jones worked with the Glyndebourne opera during the 1980s and 1990s and served as its General Director for ten years from 1989 until 1998, during which time the new opera house was built, designed by Michael Hopkins and Partners, opening in 1994. He was the General Director of the Dallas Opera from 2000 to 2002, involved in the commissioning of a new theatre for the opera company, designed by the Norman Foster practice, and the Garsington Opera from 2005 until 2012, moving the company from its original home in Garsington village to the Wormsley Estate, Buckinghamshire, where he oversaw the commissioning of its new opera house, designed by Robin Snell Associates which opened in 2011. In 2004 - 2005 he was artistic director of Casa da Musica in Porto, Portugal, opening its renowned new concert hall, designed by Rem Koolhaas, in 2005. He has served on the board of the English National Opera since 2012.

== Personal life ==
In 1974, he married Camilla (née Barlow); daughter of Erasmus Darwin Barlow (and a great-great-granddaughter of the naturalist Charles Darwin). They have one daughter, Eleanor Gwen Whitworth-Jones (born 1975); he also has two stepchildren (Luke and Amy) from her first marriage to Martin C. Mitcheson.
