= Green baronets of Belsize Park (1901) =

Escutcheon of the Green baronets of Belsize Park

The Green Baronetcy, of Belsize Park Gardens in the Metropolitan Borough of Hampstead in the County of London, was created in the Baronetage of the United Kingdom on 19 December 1901 for Frank Green, Lord Mayor of London from 1900 to 1901. The title became extinct on the death of the fourth Baronet in 1959.

== Green baronets, of Belsize Park (1901) ==
- Sir Frank Green, 1st Baronet (1835–1902)
- Sir Francis Haydn Green, 2nd Baronet (1871–1956)
- Sir Leonard Henry Haydn Green, 3rd Baronet (1879–1958)
- Sir George Arthur Haydn Green, 4th Baronet (1884–1959)

== Notes ==
Baronetage of the United Kingdom
Preceded by Church baronets	Green baronets of Belsize Park; 19 December 1901	Succeeded by Barlow baronets
