= John Padel =

British psychoanalyst and classicist

John Hunter Padel (3 May 1913 – 24 October 1999) was a British psychoanalyst and classicist.

He was born in Carlisle, where his father Charles Padel was headmaster of Carlisle Grammar School. His mother was Mòrag (née Hunter), 3rd daughter of William Hunter, MD. He was named after his ancestor, the surgeon John Hunter. He gained a scholarship to Queen's College, Oxford.

He married Hilda Horatio Barlow, daughter of Sir Alan Barlow and Nora Darwin, in 1944. She was a granddaughter of Charles Darwin. They had five children:

- Ruth Padel (born 1946), the poet
- Oliver James Padel (born 1948), mediaeval Cornish and Welsh historian
- Nicola Mary Padel (born 1951), psychiatrist and psychoanalytic psychotherapist
- Felix John Padel (born 1955), anthropologist
- Adam Frederick Padel (born 1958), histopathologist
