= Thomas Barlow (British businessman) =

British businessman (1883–1964)

Barlow in 1934.

Sir Thomas Dalmahoy Barlow (23 February 1883 – 22 November 1964) was a British businessman, banker, and art collector and historian.

Barlow was the second son of the royal physician Sir Thomas Barlow, 1st Baronet, and his wife Ada Dalmahoy. His brother was Alan Barlow, 2nd Bt. He was educated at Marlborough College and Trinity College, Cambridge.

He married Esther Sophia Gaselee on 15 February 1911, and they had three children:

- Theodora Gertrude Barlow (born 21 February 1912)
- Penelope Sophia Barlow (10 April 1914 − 1995)
- Basil Stephen Barlow (15 February 1918 – 15 October 1991)

He was made Knight Commander of the Order of the British Empire in 1934 and promoted to Knight Grand Cross of the Order of the British Empire in 1946.
