= Ida Darwin =

British mental health campaigner (1854–1946)

- Born: 7 November 1854
- Died: 5 July 1946 (aged 91)
- Spouse: Sir Horace Darwin
- Children: Erasmus Darwin IV; Ruth Frances Darwin; Nora Barlow

Ida, Lady Darwin (née Farrer; 7 November 1854 – 5 July 1946) was the wife of Sir Horace Darwin, member of the Ladies Dining Society, and a co-founder in 1913 of the Central Association for the Care of the Mentally Defective (in 1921 renamed the Central Association for Mental Welfare).

Darwin was born Emma Cecilia Farrer and took the name Ida from Hans Christian Andersen’s fairy tale of Little Ida's Flowers. Her father was Permanent Secretary to the Board of Trade Thomas Farrer and her mother was Frances Erskine, daughter of the historian and orientalist William Erskine and granddaughter of Sir James Mackintosh. Thomas Farrer was a friend of Charles Darwin and, following the death of Frances Farrer, married Katherine Wedgwood, niece of Emma Darwin. On 3 January 1880, she married her stepmother's cousin, Sir Horace Darwin, youngest son of Charles and Emma Darwin, at St Mary's, Bryanston Square. The couple had a son and two daughters:

- Erasmus Darwin IV (7 December 1881 – 24 April 1915) who was killed in the Second Battle of Ypres during the First World War.
- Ruth Frances Darwin (1883–1972) who was an advocate of eugenics and married Dr William Rees-Thomas.
- Emma Nora Darwin (1885–1989) who edited the 1959 edition of The Autobiography of Charles Darwin and married the civil servant Sir Alan Barlow.

Ida and Horace Darwin settled in Cambridge, where they lived at "The Orchards", a 24-room mansion on Huntingdon Road. A full complement of servants gave Darwin the leisure to pursue activities outside the home. In 1883 she was a founding member of the Cambridge Association for the Care of Girls, an organisation that identified working-class girls who were deemed to be wayward or out of control and placed them in domestic service or sent them to training institutions for service, and that also ran recreational clubs for girls. She later joined the Ladies Dining Society.

Darwin was also on the committee of the Cambridge Charity Organisation Society and in 1908, in response to the recommendations of Royal Commission for the Care and Control of the Feeble-Minded, together with Florence Ada Keynes formed a sub-committee to enquire into the number of "defective" children in Borough schools. This sub-committee became the Cambridge Association for the Care of the Feeble-Minded and members included the Mayor of Cambridge, the Regius Professor of Medicine and representatives from the Borough Education Committee, the Eastern Counties Asylum in Colchester and the Cambridge Association for the Care of Girls. The group campaigned for the passage of legislation that would put the recommendations of the Royal Commission into force and organised meetings and conferences. In 1912 the Association, jointly with Cambridge University Eugenics Society, held a meeting in the Guildhall, where Ellen Pinsent read a paper on Mental Defect and its Social Dangers.

After the Mental Deficiency Act was passed in 1913 the Association merged with the Cambridgeshire Voluntary Association for the Care of the Mentally Defective, which had just been formed by the County Council. This organisation was affiliated to the Central Association for the Care of the Mentally Defective (later the Central Association for Mental Welfare). Darwin was a vice-president of the Central Association for Mental Welfare and as such was a signatory to a letter to The Times in 1929 calling for the segregation and supervision of existing defectives and an inquiry into the causes of mental deficiency:

"Since its formation in 1914 the Central Association for Mental Welfare has on numerous occasion drawn public attention to the social problem presented by mental deficiency and to the grave consequences and serious cost entailed by the presence of mental defectives in the community".

Although Darwin reduced her public commitments following the death of her son in 1915, she maintained links with the Central Association for Mental Welfare until the end of her life.

Darwin died on 5 July 1946, aged 91, and is buried in Cambridge at the Parish of the Ascension Burial Ground, along with her husband. She had an obituary in The Times, with a further note by Leslie Scott who described her as "one of the pioneers in this country in the field of social work". The Ida Darwin Hospital, built in the 1960s on the Fulbourn Hospital site, was named in her honour. She also has an iris, Mrs Horace Darwin, named after her.
