= Marriott Cooke =

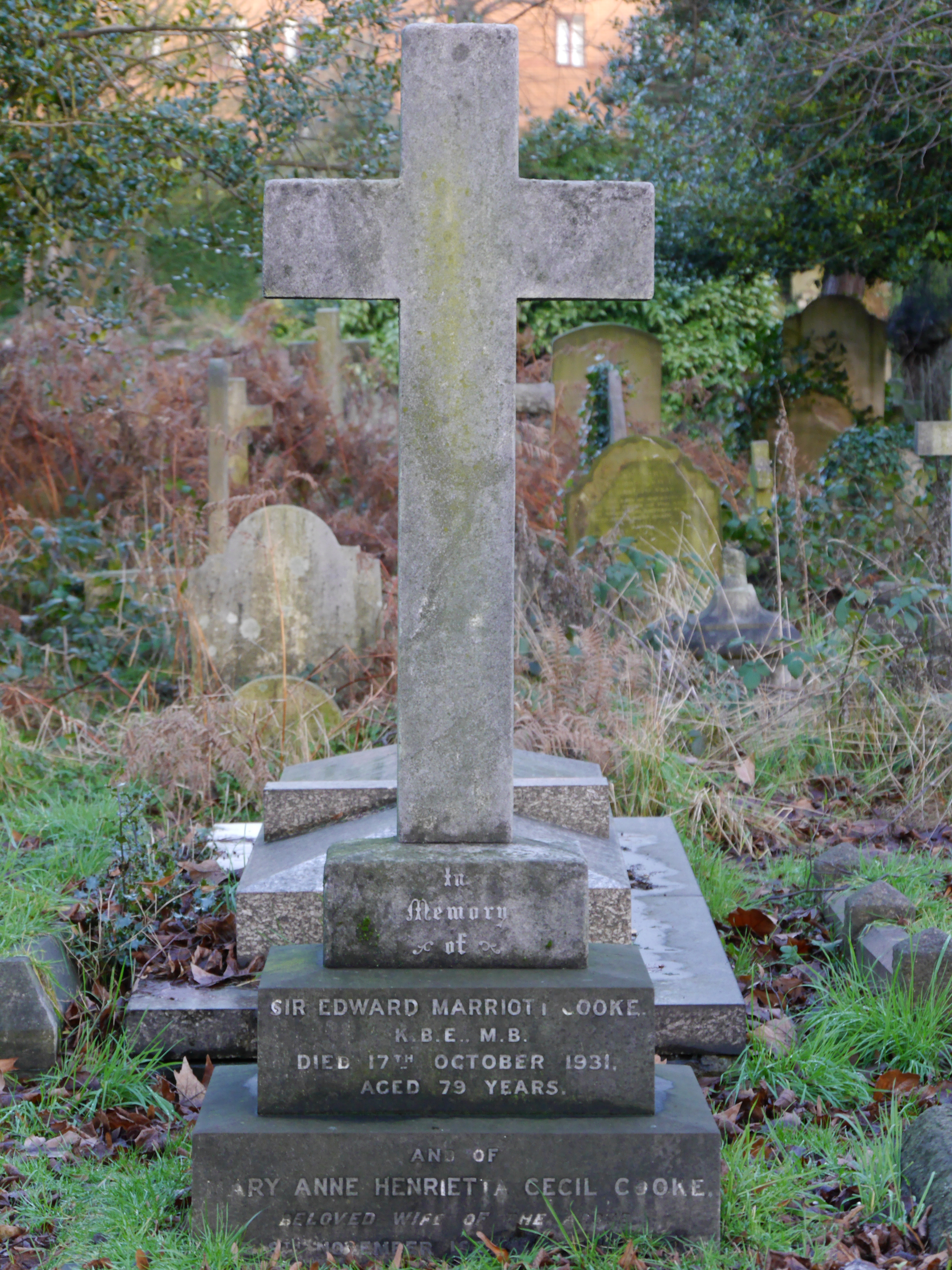
Funerary monument, Brompton Cemetery, London

Sir Edward Marriott Cooke KBE (1852 – 17 October 1931) was a British doctor and Commissioner in Lunacy from 1898 to 1914, and a Commissioner of the Board of Control for Lunacy and Mental Deficiency.

== Early life ==
Edward Marriott Cooke was the eldest of the two children of Henry Edward Cooke of Harrow. He was privately educated in Southampton and at Highgate School, followed by King's College London and King's College Hospital.

== Career ==
From 1898 to 1914, he was one of the Commissioners in Lunacy, a UK public body established by the Lunacy Act 1845 to oversee the asylums and the general welfare of the mentally ill.

Shaw was also a Commissioner of the Board of Control for Lunacy and Mental Deficiency.

In 1918, he was made a Knight Commander of the Order of the British Empire (KBE).

== Personal life ==
Cooke died at his London home on 17 October 1931.
