= William Rees-Thomas =

British psychiatrist (1887–1978)

- Born: 15 June 1887; Senny, Breconshire
- Died: 13 April 1978 (aged 90); Surrey
- Spouse(s): Muriel Hodgson Jones (m. 1917; died 1934) Ruth Darwin (m. 1948; died 1972)

William Rees-Thomas CB FRCP FRSM (15 June 1887 – 13 April 1978) was a Welsh psychiatrist. He was Medical Senior Commissioner for the Board of Control for Lunacy and Mental Deficiency.

Born in Senny, Breconshire, he was educated at County School, Brecon and Cardiff University. He became a Member of the Royal College of Physicians in 1913 and a Fellow of the Royal College of Physicians in 1933.

He was awarded the Alfred Sheen Prize, 1906; Alfred Hughes Memorial Medal, 1907; Llewelyn Prize, 1909; Murchison Scholar (RCP), 1912; Gaskell Prize and gold medal.

During the First World War he served in the Royal Army Medical Corps

He was appointed to the Board of Control in 1931, replacing Arthur Rotherham as Medical Senior Commissioner

He was made a Companion of the Order of the Bath (CB) in 1950

He married Muriel Hodgson Jones in 1917; they had a son Frederick Douglas Rees-Thomas (1920–1995), and daughter Aelwyn Minette (1922–2012). He was widowed in 1934. In 1948 he remarried Ruth Darwin, a colleague of his on the Board of Control, daughter of Sir Horace and Lady Ida Darwin they had no children, and she died in 1972. He died in Surrey in 1978.
