= Charles Padel =

English educationalist

Charles Frederick Christian Padel MA (20 July 1872 – 11 March 1958) was an English educationalist, headmaster of Ashby Grammar School from 1909 to 1912 and of Carlisle Grammar School, 1912 to 1932

Padel was born in York, the son of Christian Gottlieb Padel. He was educated at St Peter's School, York, and Sidney Sussex College, Cambridge, gaining a 1st Class degree in the Classical Tripos in 1894.

Padel worked as an assistant master at several public schools; Haileybury College (1895), Merchiston Castle School (1895–1896), Rossall Preparatory School (1896–1898), The Leys School, Cambridge (1899), Sherborne School (1900–1901), Eastbourne College (1901–1907) and Marlborough College, (1907–1909). He was then headmaster of Ashby Grammar School from 1909 to 1912 and of Carlisle Grammar School, 1912 to 1932.

In 1910 at St Jude's Church, Kensington, London he married Mòrag Una Fioughal Hunter, the third daughter of John Hunter MD of Rothesay and his wife Sarah Agnes Matilda (née Anderson). They had three sons including John Hunter Padel (1913-1999), the psychoanalyst, and one daughter, Una C.C. Padel (born 1918) who (1961) married Sir George Bishop.

He died in Oxford in 1958.
