= Isabel Wilson =

Scottish psychiatrist

Isabel Grace Hood Wilson CBE FRCP
- Born: 9 June 1895; Lasswade, Scotland
- Died: 8 December 1982 (aged 87)
- Education: University of Edinburgh
- Known for: Principal Medical Officer, Ministry of Health
- Medical career
- Field: psychiatry

Isabel Grace Hood Wilson CBE FRCP (6 September 1895 – 8 December 1982) was a Scottish psychiatrist, who was Principal Medical Officer of the Ministry of Health.

== Biography ==
Isabel Grace Hood Wilson was born on 6 September 1895 in Lasswade, Scotland. Her parents were Susan Charlotte Sandeman and George Robert Wilson, a physician and psychiatrist. She studied medicine at the University of Edinburgh, graduating in 1921 with an MB ChB, and MD in 1926.

In 1931, Wilson was appointed as a Commissioner of The Board of Control, holding the position until 1948. From 1949 to 1960 she was a Senior Commissioner, after which the Board was abolished and her position was changed to the Principal Medical Officer, Ministry of Health.

She became a Fellow of the Royal College of Physicians in 1947.

== Awards and honours ==
She received a CBE in the 1961 New Year Honours for services as Medical Senior Commissioner at the Board of Control.
