= Bedford Pierce =

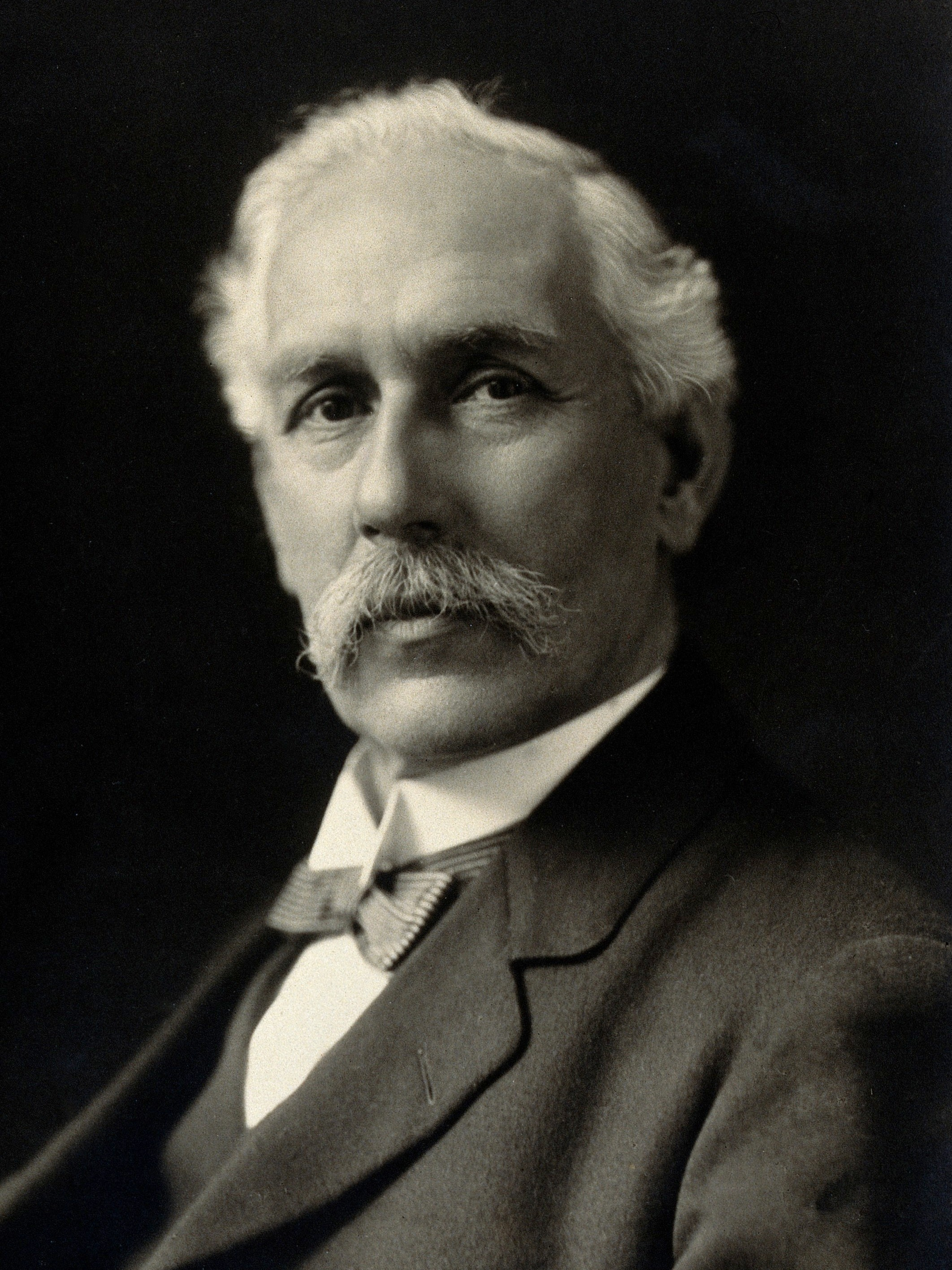
Bedford Pierce

Bedford Pierce FRCP (21 May 1861 – 8 July 1932) was an English medical doctor, a Commissioner to the Board of Control for Lunacy and Mental Deficiency and Consulting Physician to The Retreat, York.

Pierce was born in Manchester to Edmund Kell Pierce and Elizabeth Tyler. Aged 14, after completing his school studies at the Friends’ School, Croydon, he started working at a pharmaceutical firm in London. He later enrolled to St. Bartholomew's Hospital, where he won several scholarships and prizes before receiving his M.B. degree in 1888. In 1890 he won the Murchison Scholarship of the Royal College of Physicians. He then worked as physician at St. Bartholomew's, Bethlem Royal Hospital and the Edinburgh Royal Asylum, Morningside, and in 1892 became medical superintendent at the Retreat, York.

There he built a Nurses Home (1898) and spent much effort on improving the training and status of mental nurses. In parallel, he taught mental diseases at Leeds University from 1908 to 1911 and had a consulting practice at Leeds. He was president of the Medico-Psychological Association between 1919 and 1920. After retiring in 1922, he visited America, Africa and India, and served as a Commissioner in Lunacy in 1929–1931. Pierce was a Quaker and spent his free time on gardening, wood-carving, painting, mountaineering and games. In 1890 he married Mary Isabella, with whom he had a son and daughter. He died at Harpenden.
