= George Bishop (civil servant) =

British civil servant and businessman

Sir George Sidney Bishop CB OBE (15 October 1913 – 9 April 1999) was a British civil servant and businessman.

== Early life ==
George Bishop was born near Wigan in Lancashire.

== Education ==
Bishop attended Ashton-in-Makerfield Grammar School (since 1978 Byrchall High School) and the London School of Economics to read Economics and Government under Harold Laski.

== Career ==
Bishop's first job was for a Quaker organisation in South Wales which assisted the unemployed through subsistence production. On the outbreak of the second world war he moved to the Ministry of Food as a statistician, subsequently running its Emergency Services division.

After the war Bishop became a private secretary to ministers of food Ben Smith and John Strachey. Bishop was active in winding up the disastrous groundnut oil scheme. In 1959 he was promoted to Deputy Secretary, then the youngest such appointment ever.

In 1961 Bishop moved to the then sugar company Booker McConnell, becoming vice-chairman in 1970 and chairman in 1972. He was knighted in 1975 and retired in 1979.

== Exploration ==
Having climbed his first mountain at the age of 8, Bishop regularly climbed in North Wales, the Lake District and Scotland. He and second wife Una went on 18 expeditions to the Himalayas. For the Royal Geographical Society, of which he was president 1983–87, he mounted a scientific expedition to the Kimberley area of Western Australia. He made the first crossing of the Wunaamin Miliwundi Range there with Una.

== Personal life ==
He married Marjorie Woodruff in 1940; they had one daughter but the marriage was dissolved in 1961. In the same year he remarried Una C.C. Padel, daughter of Charles Padel. Lady Bishop died in 2015 at the age of 96.

== Honours ==
- 1947 – Officer of the Order of the British Empire (OBE) – Civil Division.
- 1958 – Companion of the Order of the Bath (CB) – Civil Division.
- 1975 – Knight Bachelor (Kt).
- Fellowship of the Royal Geographical Society.
