= Ladbroke Black =

Ladbroke Lionel Day Black (21 June 1877 – 27 July 1940) was an English journalist and author who wrote mysteries, fantasy and science fiction stories, often under pseudonyms such as Lionel Day, Lewis Jackson and Paul Urquhart.

== Life ==
Black was born in Burley-in-Wharfedale and was educated in Ireland and at Cambridge. His father Charles Ingham Black was the curate of Burley, and his grandfather the Irish pirate or smuggler John Black ("Black Jack"), who built Elsinore Lodge at Rosses Point, Sligo.

Black was appointed assistant editor of The Phoenix 1897–99 before taking up a similar position with The Morning Herald in London. In 1901 he became assistant editor of The Echo, joint editor of Today 1904–05 and was a special writer on the Weekly Dispatch between 1905 and 1911.

He lived in Wendover for many years.

== Works ==
Black published his first novel, A Muddied Oaf co-written with Francis Rutter in 1902. He collaborated with Robert Lynd on the 1906 collection The Mantle of the Emperor. With Thomas Meech he wrote a series of novels beginning with The Eagle (1906) under the pen name Paul Urquhart. He also wrote for newspapers and magazines, sometimes under the pen name Lionel Day. He also wrote some Sexton Blake books, but he is better known for his own detective creation Havlock Preed.

Novels:

- The Eagles (1906)
- One Clear Call (1914)
- The Turmoil (1915)
- Cross Currents (1916)
- The Buried World (1927)

Short stories:

- The Panacea Boom (1902)
- Monsieur Lecoq's Casebook (1908)

The Great Bank Safe Mystery, The Blackmailers, The Country House Tragedy.

- Famous Mysteries (1908)

The Strange Death of Lieutenant Roper, The Eight-minute Mystery, The Tragedy of Constance Kent, Who Murdered Sarah Roberts?, The Burton Crescent Murder, The Great Harley Street Enigma, The Battersea Mutilation Case.

- Through the Shadows (1912)
- The Ballydoyle Regatta (1913)
- My Lady of the Halls (1913)
- Nurse Sorrell's Patient (1913)
- The Tremendous Adventure of Mr. Jones (1915)
- Cinderella (1915)
- They Also Serve (1915)
- Mother O’Mine (1917)
- Ordeal by Battle (1917)
- The Prodigal Father (1917)
- The Way of a Maid and a Man (1918)
- A Splendid Surprise (1920)
- Red Magnus Backs Out (1933)

== Family ==
Black married Margaret Ambrose, daughter of William Ambrose barrister, QC and Tory MP, who was buried in Highgate West Cemetery in 1908 (his headstone was photographed by John Gay and is in the English Heritage photo library). They had four sons and two daughters. His wife Margaret was a suffragette, left-wing political journalist and writer, often writing under the pen name of Philippa Gray. According to her son Stephen Black, his father was very proud of his mother's popular literary success, getting very excited when he saw posters advertising her latest novel on the side of buses.

His son Stephen Black was also an author and a doctor; his daughter Brigit Ursula Hope Black (Biddy) married Erasmus Darwin Barlow. His grandson was the family planning pioneer Tim Black. His great-granddaughter is the architect Pippa Nissen.
