= Erasmus Darwin IV =

Grandson of Charles Darwin

Erasmus Darwin
- 2nd Lt. Erasmus Darwin in uniform of The Green Howards.
- Born: 7 December 1881; The Orchard, Cambridge
- Died: 24 April 1915 (aged 33)
- Parent(s): Sir Horace Darwin; Ida Darwin
- Military career
- Branch: British Army
- Service years: 1914–1915
- Rank: Second Lieutenant
- Unit: Green Howards
- Conflicts: First World War †

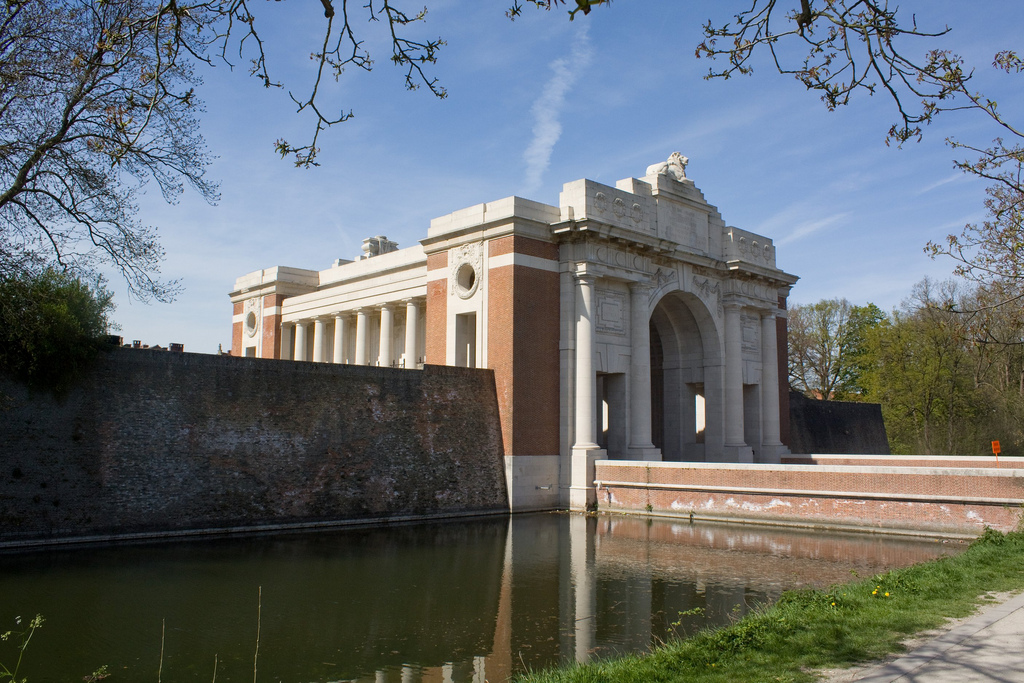
The Menin Gate in Ypres, Belgium

Erasmus Darwin (7 December 1881 – 24 April 1915) was an English businessman and soldier, killed in the First World War. He was the grandson of the naturalist Charles Darwin.

== Family and early life ==
Darwin was born in The Orchard, Cambridge, the son of Horace Darwin and his wife Ida (née Farrer), daughter of Thomas Farrer, 1st Baron Farrer. Erasmus was Charles and Emma Darwin's second grandson after the birth of Bernard Darwin 5 years earlier. Charles wrote to Horace to congratulate them on the birth. However, Charles was unable to travel from his home at Down House in Kent to Cambridge to see his newborn grandson due to his ill health; his heart was failing and would eventually result in his death in April 1882. Darwin was named after his great uncle Erasmus Alvey Darwin who died 3 months before his birth, and after his great-great-grandfather Erasmus Darwin.

Darwin had two younger sisters; Ruth (1883–1972) and Nora (1885–1989), later Lady Barlow.

He was brought up at Cambridge and at Abinger Hall in Surrey, the seat of his maternal grandfather. He is mentioned several times in his cousin Gwen Raverat's childhood memoir Period Piece. His family at Cambridge also included the uncles William Erasmus Darwin (Uncle William), Francis Darwin (Uncle Frank), George Darwin (Uncle George), Leonard Darwin (Uncle Lenny), and aunts Henrietta Litchfield (Aunt Etty) and Elizabeth Darwin (Aunt Bessy). His paternal grandmother, Emma Darwin ("grandmama"), resided in part at Down House and in part at Cambridge until her death in 1896.

== Education and business career ==
Darwin was schooled at King's College School, Cambridge and then Marlborough College ( in Cotton House). He was admitted to Trinity College, Cambridge as an exhibitioner on 25 June 1901. He was awarded the Maths Prize in 1902. He took the Mathematical Tripos in his second year and afterwards the Engineering Tripos, coming 2nd in the class of 1905. He was awarded a BA degree in 1904 and an MA in 1910.

After graduating, he worked for Mather and Platt in Manchester, and later for Bolckow and Vaughan in Middlesbrough, where he became company secretary. He was also a director of the Cambridge Scientific Instrument Company, the firm founded by his father. He went on a business trip to North America with John Edward Stead.

== Military career and death ==
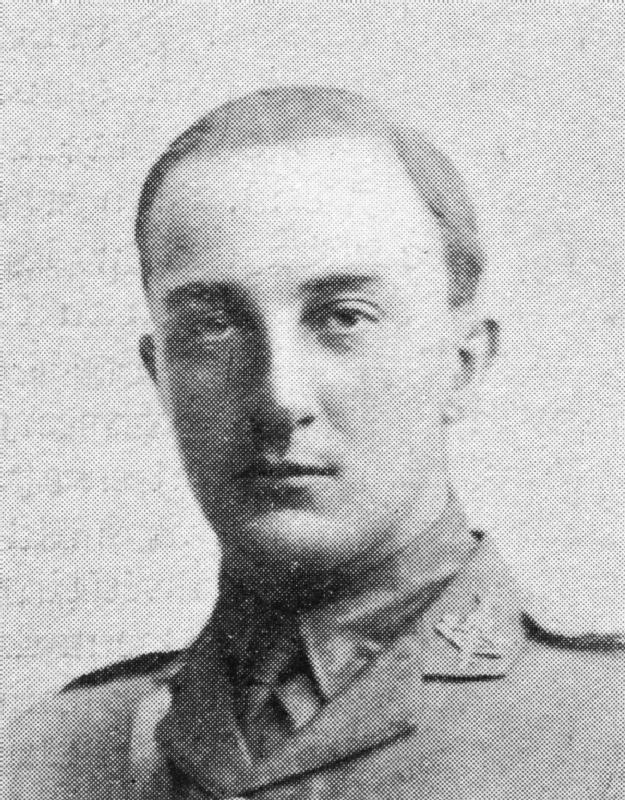
Captain John Vivian Nancarrow, who was reported buried with Darwin.

Darwin was commissioned as a Second Lieutenant in the 4th Battalion of the Green Howards (Alexandra Princess of Wales's Own Yorkshire Regiment), a Territorial Army infantry unit, in September 1914, shortly after the outbreak of the war in August. After the Regular Army was basically wiped out at the end of 1914, the Territorials had to replace them. The Green Howards joined the British Expeditionary Force in Belgium and France on the Western Front as part of the Northumbrian Division, on 17 April 1915. Casualty rates in the trenches among junior officers were exceptionally high, especially amongst those without any combat experience – on average, junior officers were killed or wounded after six weeks fighting. Darwin only survived one. He was shot and killed on 24 April during the Battle of St Julien, part of Second Battle of Ypres. He, along with a close colleague Captain John Nancarrow were reportedly "buried in one grave, with a little cross over it, by a farmhouse near St Julien." He was 33 years old and unmarried.

A lengthy article, part news article, part obituary and part eulogy was printed in The Times, where his cousin Bernard Darwin was on the staff. His cousin, Lady Margaret Keynes, later recalled "...on April 23 [1915], Rupert Brooke had died on his way to Gallipoli with the Naval Division, and my cousin Erasmus... ...had been killed the day after near Ypres. Reading the appalling list of casualties in The Times had become a daily terror lest it contained the names of friends and acquaintances, as it so often did."

More details were published in the book Emma Darwin: A Century of Family Letters by his Aunt Etty. These included a letter from Cpl Wearmouth to Ida, a letter from his commanding officer Col. Maurice Bell and letter from Pte Wood, as well as a letter from his former colleague John Edward Stead. Darwin family letters noted: "The Royal Irish Fusiliers recovered his body along with that of Captain Nancarrow and the two were buried together with a little cross over it by a farmhouse near St Julien." However this grave must have been destroyed in the years of subsequent fighting and he has no known grave and is commemorated on the Menin Gate Memorial. Commanding Officer, Colonel Bell wrote of him:- "Loyalty, courage and devotion to duty, he had them all.....He died in an attack which gained many compliments to the Battn. He was right in front. It was a man's death."

A separate memorial book by Bernard, Erasmus Darwin: Born 7 December 1881, Killed in Action 24 April 1915 was also published.

With intense fighting in the Ypres Salient continuing for the next three and a half years, the location of Darwin and Nancarrow's grave however was lost, and they are two of more than fifty thousand soldiers with no known grave memorialised on the Menin Gate in Ypres. He is also memorialised on the war memorial within Trinity College Chapel, Cambridge, The Savile Club in London and within Marlborough College Memorial Hall. His name appears on the Saltburn by the Sea war memorial, which stands close to his last home in Albion Terrace, as listed in the 1911 census.
