= Robert Cunyngham-Brown =

British psychologist

Robert Cunyngham-Brown CBE (1867 – 7 October 1945) was a British psychologist and medical administrator.

He was a commissioner of the Board of Control for Lunacy and Mental Deficiency.
