= Thomas Meech =

English journalist, author and lawyer

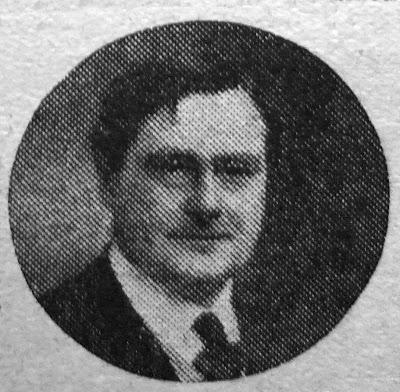
Thomas Meech

Thomas Cox Meech (1868 – 20 October 1940) was an English journalist, author and lawyer.

Born in Beaminster and educated at Ardingly College, Meech was initially intent on becoming a lawyer but instead turned to journalism, becoming editor of Ayrshire Post, Lancashire Daily Post and the Northern Echo. He published his first novel Only a Collier in 1890. Other books include biographies of Thomas Burt and William McKinley and a history of the Great Britain and Ireland called This Generation (1927–28). With Ladbroke Black he wrote several books under the pen name Paul Urquhart.
