= Laurence Brock =

British civil servant

Brock in 1945.

Sir Laurence George Brock CB (7 May 1879 – 29 April 1949) was a British civil servant. He was chairman of the Board of Control for Lunacy and Mental Deficiency from 1928 to 1945.

Brock was born in Islington, London to George William Frederick Brock, a clerk, and Eliza Jane Wilkins. His younger sister, Dorothy Brock, was a headmistress of the Mary Datchelor School, Prior to becoming chairman of the Board of Control, Brock served as private secretary to the Financial Secretary to the Admiralty (1905–12), assistant secretary to the National Health Insurance Commission (1912–16), assistant secretary to the Ministry of Health (1919–25), and principal assistant secretary of the Board of Control (1925–28).

He was appointed a Companion of the Order of the Bath in 1919 and was knighted in 1935. He was also a Chevalier of the Order of the Crown of Italy.

Brock was a eugenicist who was appointed the Chair of the Departmental Committee on Sterilisation and lead author of its 1934 report, which became known as the Brock Report.

He died in 1949 in Oxford. Eight portraits are held by the National Portrait Gallery in London.

He married Ellen Margery Williams on 31 July 1917. They had two sons and one daughter. Lady Brock died in 1976.
