= Nora Barlow =

British botanist and geneticist

Emma Nora Barlow
- Born: Emma Nora Darwin; 22 December 1885
- Died: 29 May 1989 (aged 103)
- Other name: Lady Barlow
- Education: University of Cambridge
- Spouse: Alan Barlow
- Children: 6
- Parents: Sir Horace Darwin (father); The Hon. Ida, Lady Darwin (mother)
- Scientific career
- Fields: plant genetics
- Workplaces: John Innes Institute

Emma Nora Barlow, Lady Barlow (née Darwin; 22 December 1885 – 29 May 1989), was a British botanist and geneticist. The granddaughter of the British naturalist Charles Darwin, Barlow began her academic career studying botany at Cambridge under Frederick Blackman, and continued her studies in the new field of genetics under William Bateson from 1904 to 1906. Her primary research focus when working with Bateson was the phenomenon of heterostylism within the primrose family. In later life she was one of the first Darwinian scholars, and founder of the Darwin Industry of scholarly research into her grandfather's life and discoveries. She lived to 103.

== Biography ==
=== Personal life ===
Nora, as she was known, was the daughter of the civil engineer Sir Horace Darwin and his wife The Hon. Ida, Lady Darwin (née Farrer), daughter of Thomas Farrer, 1st Baron Farrer. Her elder brother Erasmus was killed during the Second Battle of Ypres in 1915; She also had a sister, Ruth Darwin.

In 1911 she married Alan Barlow, son of the Royal Physician Sir Thomas Barlow. They had six children:

- Joan Helen Barlow (1912–1954)
- Sir Thomas Erasmus Barlow, 3rd Baronet. (1914–2003), naval officer.
- Erasmus Darwin Barlow (1915–2005)
- Andrew Dalmahoy Barlow (1916–2006)
- Hilda Horatia Barlow (1919–2017) married psychoanalyst John Hunter Padel; their daughter is the poet Ruth Padel.
- Horace Basil Barlow (1921–2020)

Additionally, she temporarily cared for her cousin Gwen Raverat's daughters Elisabeth and Sophie during Gwen's breakdown after the death of her husband Jacques Raverat. She became Lady Barlow after her husband was knighted in 1938.

She was widowed in 1968. Cambridge University Library has a painting of her in old age by her daughter-in-law Yvonne Barlow.

=== Scientific research ===
She worked as a research assistant at the John Innes Institute from 1905, and studied plant genetics under William Bateson at Cambridge in 1906, a centre for pioneering genetics research, and was an active member of the Cambridge University Genetics Society. She published papers on her study of the primrose flower in 1913 and 1923 which drew on her grandfather's The Different Forms of Flowers on Plants of the Same Species.

She did not publish any further work after her marriage, but she continued her study in genetics throughout her family life. She carried out controlled cross pollinations, including in aquilegia. She visited the John Innes Institute every summer to observe the plants that had grown there.

She was among the founders of the Genetics Society in 1919, and regularly attended its meetings, maintaining contact with friends including Ronald Fisher.

=== Darwin's editor ===
Her first book as editor was a new edition of The Voyage of the Beagle (1933).

She published an unexpurgated version of The Autobiography of Charles Darwin, which had previously had personal and religious material removed by his son, Francis. She also edited several collections of letters and notes, including correspondence between Darwin and John Stevens Henslow, his mentor.

=== Legacy ===
Aquilegia "Nora Barlow"

A cultivar of Aquilegia vulgaris, 'Nora Barlow', is named after her. A double-flowered columbine, hybridization has altered 'Nora Barlow' since it was discovered in Barlow's garden in the early 1980s.

Nora Barlow appears as a supporting character in Scott Westerfeld's 2009 young adult steampunk novels Leviathan, Behemoth, and Goliath. In Westerfeld's alternate history series, Barlow is re-imagined as a prominent genetic engineer and diplomat.

== Bibliography ==
- 1933. Charles Darwin's Diary of the Voyage of HMS Beagle, editor.
- 1946. Charles Darwin and the Voyage of the Beagle, editor. (A collection of letters and notebooks from the voyage.)
- 1958. The Autobiography of Charles Darwin, 1809–1882, editor.
- 1963. Darwin's Ornithological Notes, editor. (Barlow also wrote the Introduction, Notes, and Appendix.)
- 1967. Darwin and Henslow: The Growth of an Idea. Letters, 1831–1860, editor.
