= Barlow baronets =

Set index on Barlow baronets

There have been four baronetcies created for persons with the surname Barlow, one in the Baronetage of England and three in the Baronetage of the United Kingdom.

- Barlow baronets of Slebetch (1677)
- Barlow baronets of Fort William (1803)
- Barlow baronets of Wimpole Street (1902)
- Barlow baronets of Bradwall Hall (1907)
