= Barlow baronets of Slebetch (1677) =

Escutcheon of the Barlow baronets of Slebetch

The Barlow baronetcy, of Slebetch in the County of Pembroke, was created in the Baronetage of England on 13 July 1677 for John Barlow. He was succeeded by his son, the second Baronet. He represented Cardigan Boroughs and Haverfordwest in the House of Commons. The title became extinct after the death of his son, the third Baronet, sometime between 1756 and 1775 (date of extinction). Records in the National Archives refer to a will of Sir George Barlow Bt. dated 1792 concerning property in Scartho, Lincolnshire.

== Barlow baronets, of Slebetch (1677) ==
- Sir John Barlow, 1st Baronet (c. 1652-c. 1695) High Sheriff of Pembrokeshire, 1680
- Sir George Barlow, 2nd Baronet (c. 1680-c. 1726)
- Sir George Barlow, 3rd Baronet (died after 1756)
