= Frederick Willis (civil servant) =

English lawyer and civil servant

Sir Frederick Willis CB KBE (16 March 1863 – 17 June 1946) was an English lawyer and civil servant. He was made CB in 1914 and KBE in 1920. He was chairman of the Board of Control for Lunacy and Mental Deficiency from 1921 to 1928.
