= Board of Control for Lunacy and Mental Deficiency =

UK mental health body (1913–1946)

The Board of Control for Lunacy and Mental Deficiency was a body overseeing the treatment of the mentally ill and those with learning disabilities in England and Wales. It was created by the Mental Deficiency Act 1913 to replace the Commissioners in Lunacy, under the Home Office however it was independent in that it reported to the Lord Chancellor who had responsibility for investigating breaches of care and integrity. The board was transferred to the Ministry of Health by the Ministry of Health Act 1919, and reorganised in 1930.

The board consisted of a chairman, two senior medical commissioners, one senior legal commissioner, six commissioners including lawyers and doctors, six inspectors and administrative staff. By law, at least one of these had to be a woman. The commissioners of the board travelled around England and Wales ensuring that those detained under mental health legislation were legally in custody, their care was appropriate, and moneys and other properties owned by patients were not being misused or stolen.

The board was based in Northumberland Avenue, London, until 1939 when it was moved to Hobart House, Grosvenor Place.

Its functions were transferred to the Minister of Health by the National Health Service Act 1946.

== Members ==
Announcements of members were carried in the major national newspapers, including The Times.

- On inception of the board in 1913, the chairman was Sir William Byrne with Arthur Rotherham and Mary Dendy joining the ex officio members of the previous Lunacy Commissioners; C.H. Bond, Marriott Cooke, S. Coupland, B. T. Hodgson, S. J. F. MacLeod, F. Needham L. L. Shadwell, A. H. Trevor
- In 1916, due to Sir William Byrne moving on, Marriott Cooke became acting chairman, and Robert Welsh Braithwaite was appointed to the board.
- In 1921, Dr Ruth Darwin was appointed to the board.
- In 1926 due to Robert Welsh Braithwaite's retirement, Robert Cunyngham Brown was appointed a commissioner.
- In 1928, due to the retirement of the chairman, Sir Frederick Willis, Laurence George Brock was appointed chairman.
- In 1929, Dr Bedford Pierce was appointed a commissioner.

From the start of 1931, the board was reconstituted, with a chairman and four other members. L.G. Brock continued as chairman, with S. J. Fraser MacLeod, C. Hubert Bond, Arthur Rotherham, Ellen Pinsent.

- William Rees-Thomas was appointed to the board in 1931.
- In 1931, Dr Isabel Wilson was appointed as a commissioner, holding the position until 1948. From 1949 to 1960 she was a Senior Commissioner, after which the board was abolished and her position was changed to the Principal Medical Officer, Ministry of Health.
