= Sir Thomas Barlow, 1st Baronet =

British royal physician (1845–1945)

Sir Thomas Barlow Bt KCVO FRS FRCP
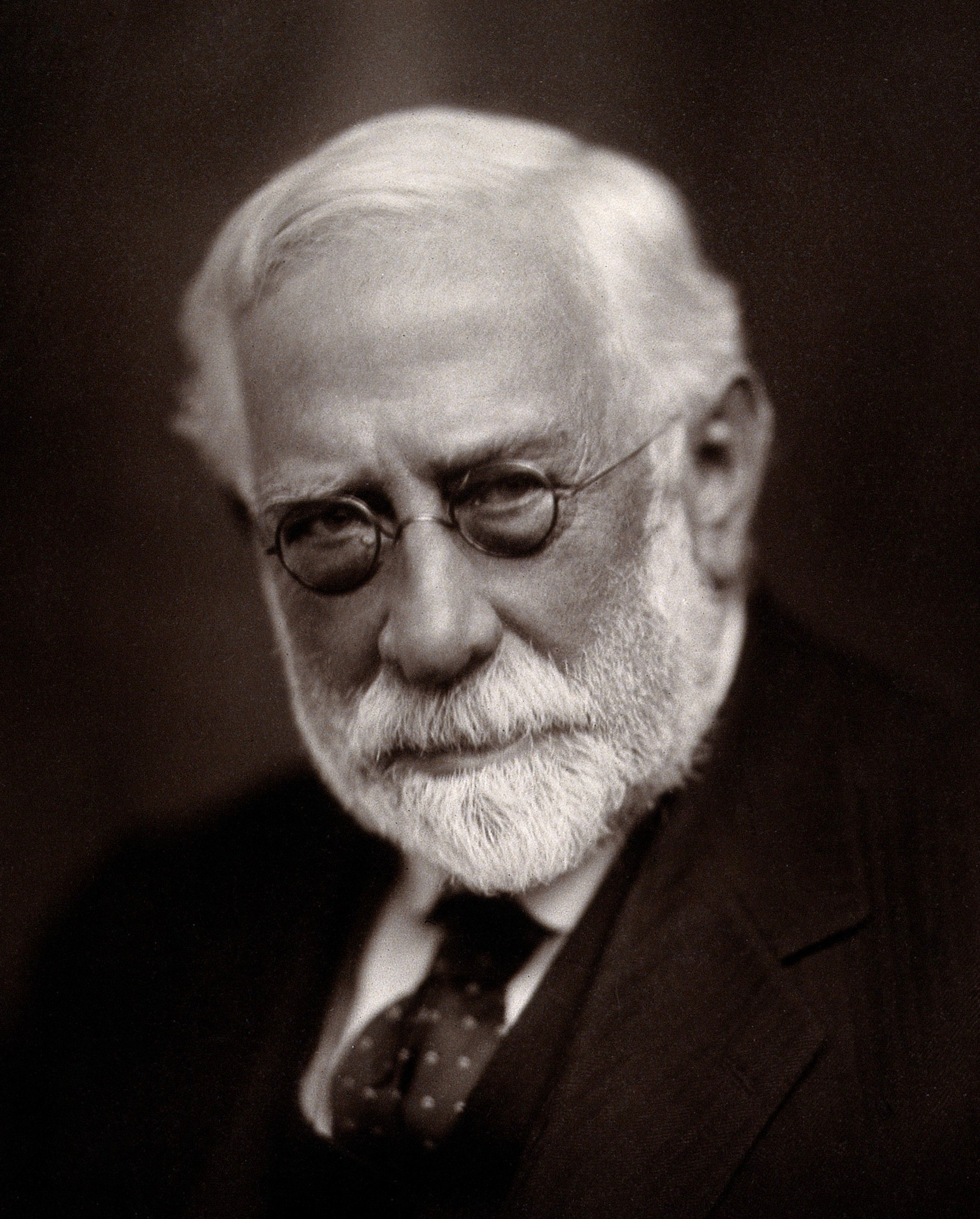
- Born: 4 November 1845; Edgworth, Lancashire, England
- Died: 12 January 1945 (aged 99); London, England
- Education: University College London (BM, MD)
- Occupation: Physician
- Spouse: Ada Helen Dalmahoy (m. 1880)
- Children: 5, including Alan and Thomas

Sir Thomas Barlow, 1st Baronet, KCVO, FRS, FRCP (4 November 1845 – 12 January 1945) was a British royal physician, known for his research on infantile scurvy.

== Early life ==
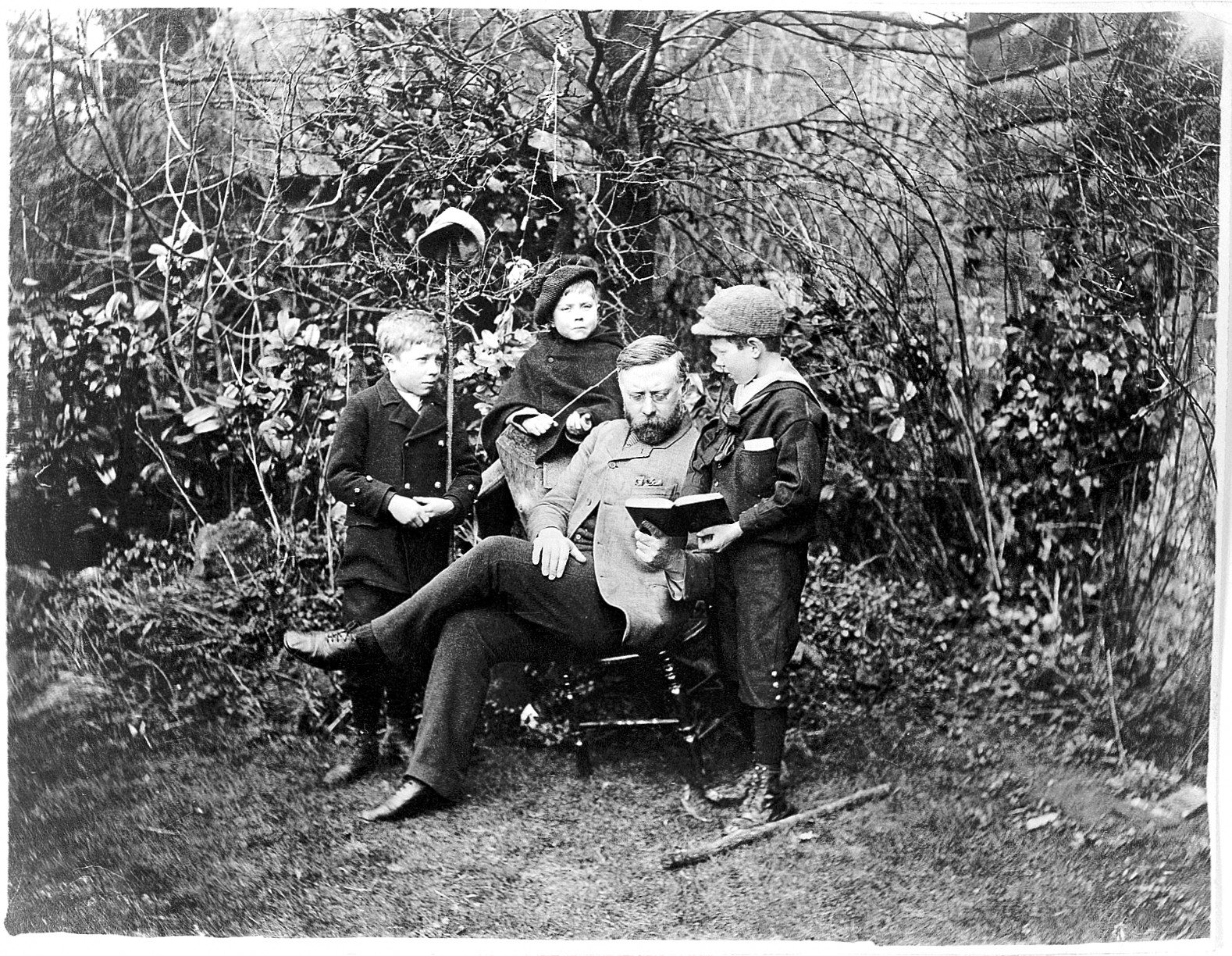
Thomas Barlow with his three sons, ca 1890. Wellcome Library

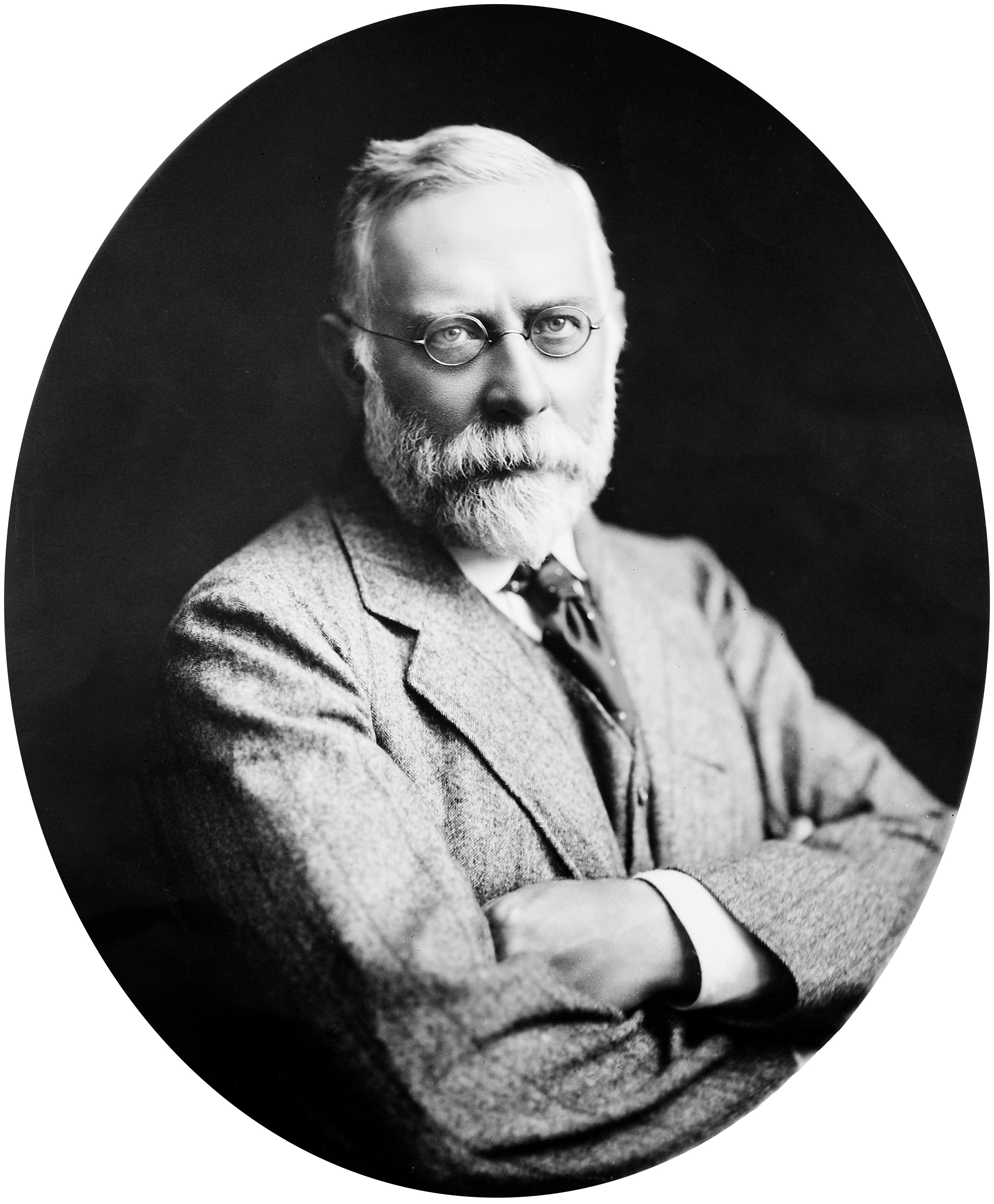
Sir Thomas Barlow

Barlow was the son of a Lancashire cotton manufacturer and Mayor of Bolton, James Barlow (1821–1887). The family were well known as philanthropists in their home village of Edgworth, Lancashire where they funded charities connected with the Methodist church including the Children's Home.

He studied as an undergraduate at Manchester and London. University College London (UCL) Bachelor of Medicine (BM) in 1873 and Doctor of Medicine (MD) 1874.

== Career ==
He became a registrar at Great Ormond Street Hospital, and later a physician and in 1899 a consultant. He was professor at the UCL from 1895 to 1907, initially of paediatrics and later of clinical medicine.

In 1883, he showed that infantile scurvy was identical with adult scurvy. Barlow's disease – infantile scurvy – is named after him.

He was Royal Physician to Queen Victoria and attended her on her death, and to Kings Edward VII and George V. He was knighted as a Knight Commander of the Royal Victorian Order in March 1901, and in February 1902 he was created a Baronet, of Wimpole Street in St Marylebone in the County of London. He was President of the Royal College of Physicians from 1910–1914 and delivered their Harveian Oration in 1916 on the subject of Harvey, The Man and the Physician. He was elected a Foreign Honorary Member of the American Academy of Arts and Sciences in 1918.

Barlow received the honorary degree Doctor of Science (D.Sc.) from the Victoria University of Manchester in February 1902, in connection with the 50th jubilee celebrations of the establishment of the university. In 1904, he was listed honorary medical staff at King Edward VII's Hospital for Officers.

== Marriage and children ==
Barlow married Ada Helen Dalmahoy, daughter of Patrick Dalmahoy WS, on 28 December 1880. They had the following children:

- Sir James Alan Noel Barlow, 2nd Bt. (1881–1968), who married Emma Nora Darwin, the granddaughter of Charles Darwin (see Darwin – Wedgwood family).
- Sir Thomas Dalmahoy Barlow (1883–1964)
- Patrick Basil Barlow (23 October 1884 – 18 January 1917), killed in the First World War
- Helen Alice Dorothy Barlow (4 May 1887 – 16 September 1975), died unmarried - see Re Barlow's Will Trusts. With her father, she was a member of the London Survey Committee, a voluntary organisation publishing architectural surveys of the capital.
- Gertrude Mary Barlow (August 1888 – 22 July 1889), died in infancy

== Death and legacy ==
He died on 12 January 1945 at 10 Wimpole Street, London aged 99. Barlow's papers are preserved in the archive of the Wellcome Library.

Academic offices
Preceded by Richard Douglas Powell	President of the Royal College of Physicians; 1910–1914	Succeeded by Sir Frederick Taylor
Baronetage of the United Kingdom
New creation	Baronet (of Wimpole Street); 1902–1945	Succeeded by James Alan Barlow
