= Old Hatfield =

Village in Hertfordshire, England

Coordinates: 51.7621°N 0.2139°W

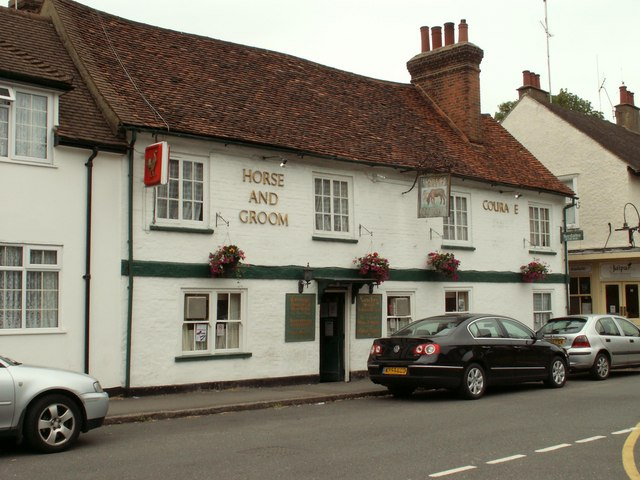
- Horse And Groom public house on Park Street, Old Hatfield

- Location within Hertfordshire
- OS grid reference: TL2308
- Civil parish: Hatfield
- District: Welwyn Hatfield
- Shire county: Hertfordshire
- Region: East
- Country: England
- Sovereign state: United Kingdom
- Post town: HATFIELD
- Postcode district: AL9
- Dialling code: 01707
- Police: Hertfordshire
- Fire: Hertfordshire
- Ambulance: East of England

Old Hatfield, sometimes called Bishops Hatfield, is a historic village in the Welwyn Hatfield district, in the county of Hertfordshire, England. It is in the town of Hatfield.

It grew up on the Great North Road, one day's journey from London by horse or coach and once had many coaching inns. It was a convenient place for the Bishops of Ely to have a lodging, giving access to both the cathedral in Ely to the north and the capital to the south. A village grew up adjacent to the estate of Bishops palace. The parish church of St Etheldreda's Church, Hatfield was named by the Bishops after their patron saint Æthelthryth.

A market was once held in Fore Street.

When Hatfield was developed as a new town after World War Two, Old Hatfield was deliberately left unspoilt by development and through traffic and so retains an historic feel.

== History ==
Old Hatfield is the result of the houses and farms which have been established near a place of worship featured by a few religious buildings by the Monks. In fact, in 970, King Edgar the Peaceful and his wife Æthelflæd Eneda had inherited the estate from her parents. The place is very attractive, there are arable lands, forests and a river some marshes bring a natural boundary against enemy. They give it to the Monks against the promise to build a church.

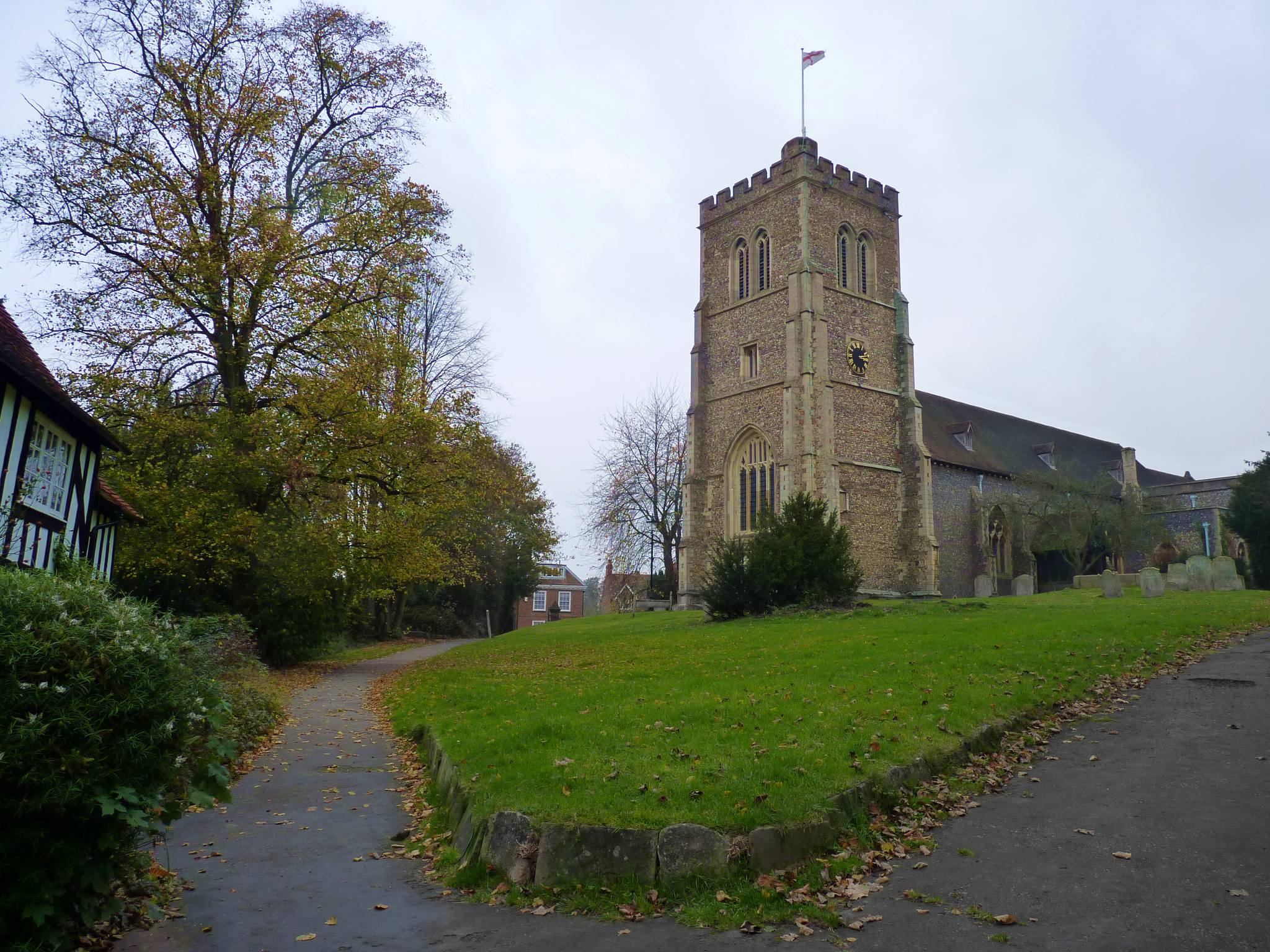
Sainte Ethelreda 's church

Over the years, needs evolve at the same time as a village gets bigger and grows up with new religious buildings. Over the years, and during 4 centuries, successively the site has belonged to the Monks, to the Abbots and to the Bishop of Ely until John Morton (cardinal) who builds there in 1485, near a parish church named St Etheldreda what is going to become Bishop Hatfield.

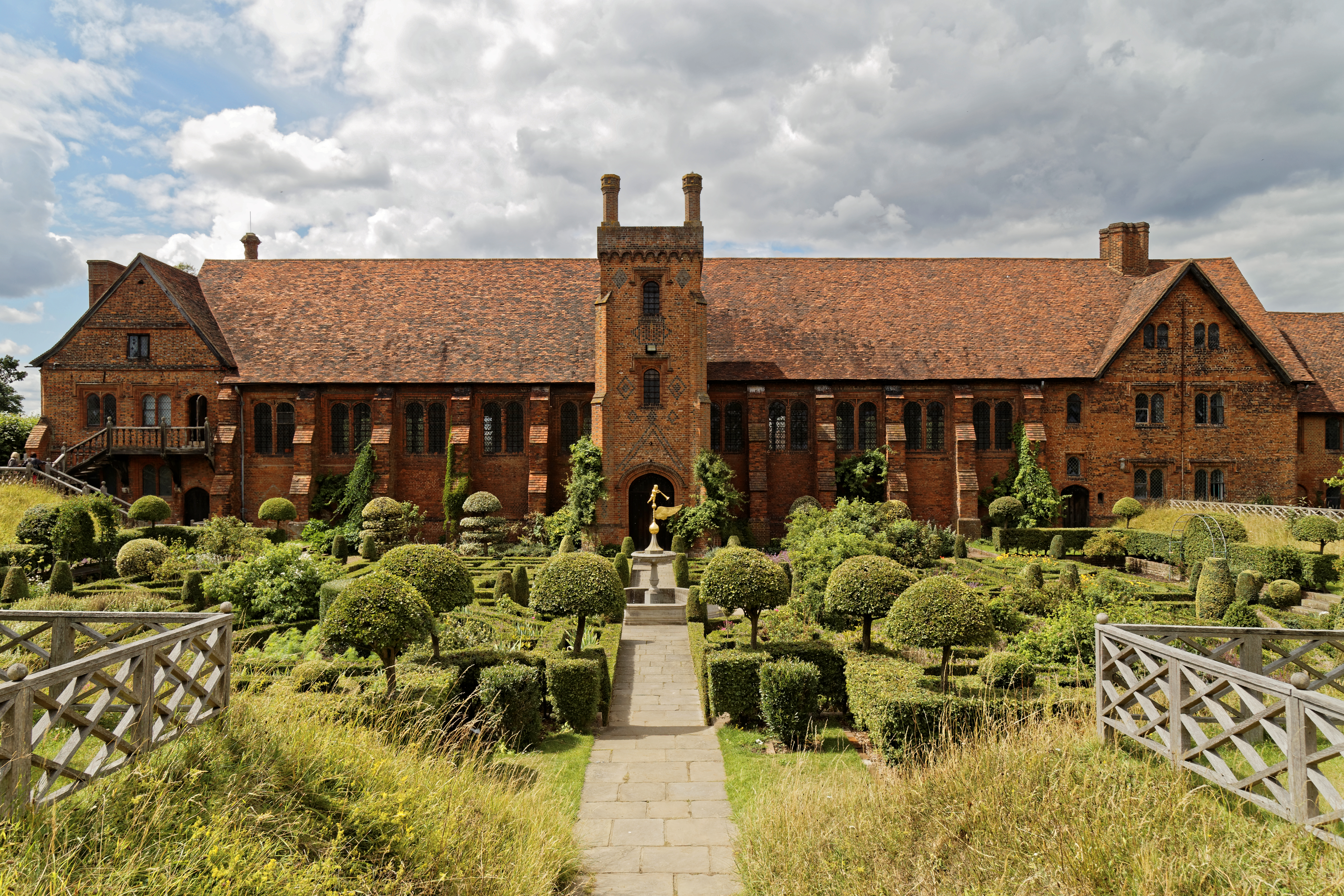
Hatfield Palace

The construction made of red bricks bearing a timber roof, according to medieval architectural style, is a quadrilateral featured by four wings with a yard inside. It is known that the estate was attended by the royal family since Henry VII of England and later his son, Henry VIII of England who decided to use the manor as the royal nursery. In 1538, he exchanged the estate with Thomas Goodrich, Bishop of Ely, against bishoprics located in Cambridgeshire and Essex that he had seized before during the Reformation's very first laws. Then all later Tudor dynastic rulers would attend this manor, then better known as Hatfield Palace. The Stuart dynasty's first sovereign, James VI and I, in 1607, was to exchange Hatfield Palace against Theobalds House, Robert Cecil, 1st Earl of Salisbury's house.

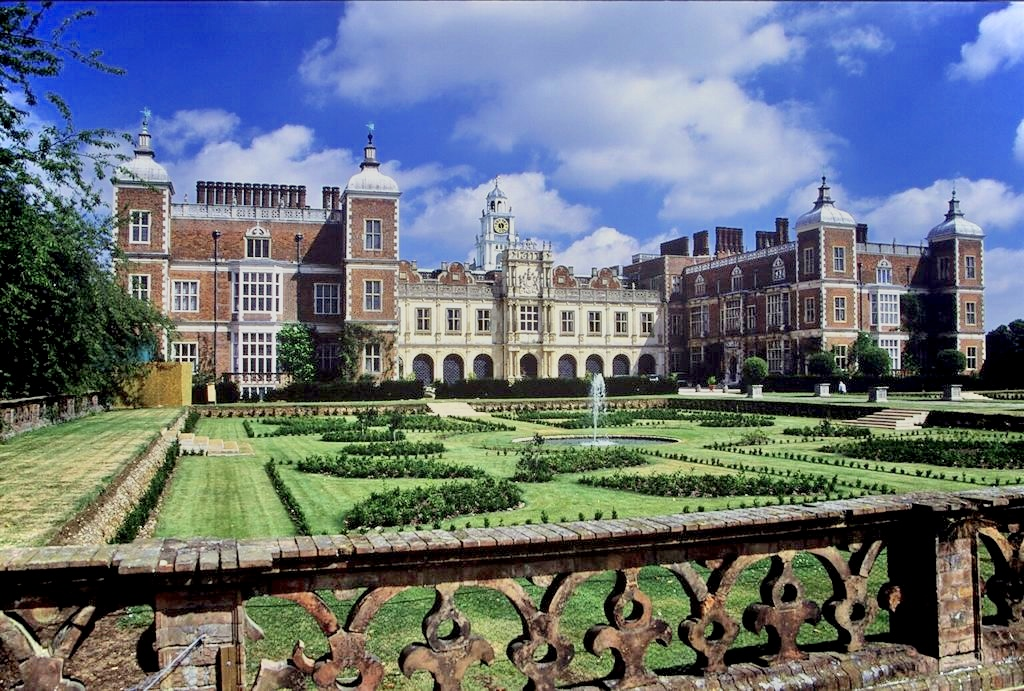
North facing view of Hatfield House

He decided to wreck three wings of the building and use the bricks to construct Cecil's new house which was named as Hatfield House, a Jacobean architectural style construction. Today, both buildings, grade I listed building, with parks and Elizabeth's Knot Garden are open to the public and can be visited, in the vicinity of Hatfield township.

1, 3 & 5 Park Street features two very rare 17th century wall paintings featuring grotesques and a cloth like texture, providing valuable insight into the development of interior decor. Historic England increased the buildings' listed status to Grade Two* in 2020.

== Civil parish ==
On 1 October 1951 the parish of Bishops Hatfield was abolished to form Hatfield, part also went to Welwyn Garden City. In 1951 the parish had a population of 13,834.
