= Horace Darwin =

British engineer (1851–1928)

Sir Horace Darwin KBE FRS
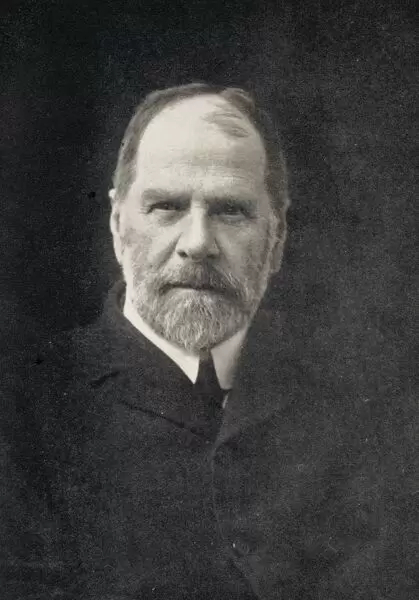
- Photograph of Horace Darwin
- Born: 13 May 1851; Downe, Kent, England
- Died: 22 September 1928 (aged 77)
- Spouse: Emma Cecilia "Ida" Farrer
- Children: Erasmus Darwin IV; Ruth Frances Darwin; Nora Barlow
- Parent(s): Charles Darwin and Emma Darwin

Sir Horace Darwin, KBE FRS (13 May 1851 – 22 September 1928) was an English engineer specializing in the design and manufacture of precision scientific instruments. He was a Fellow of Trinity College, Cambridge.

== Personal life and education ==
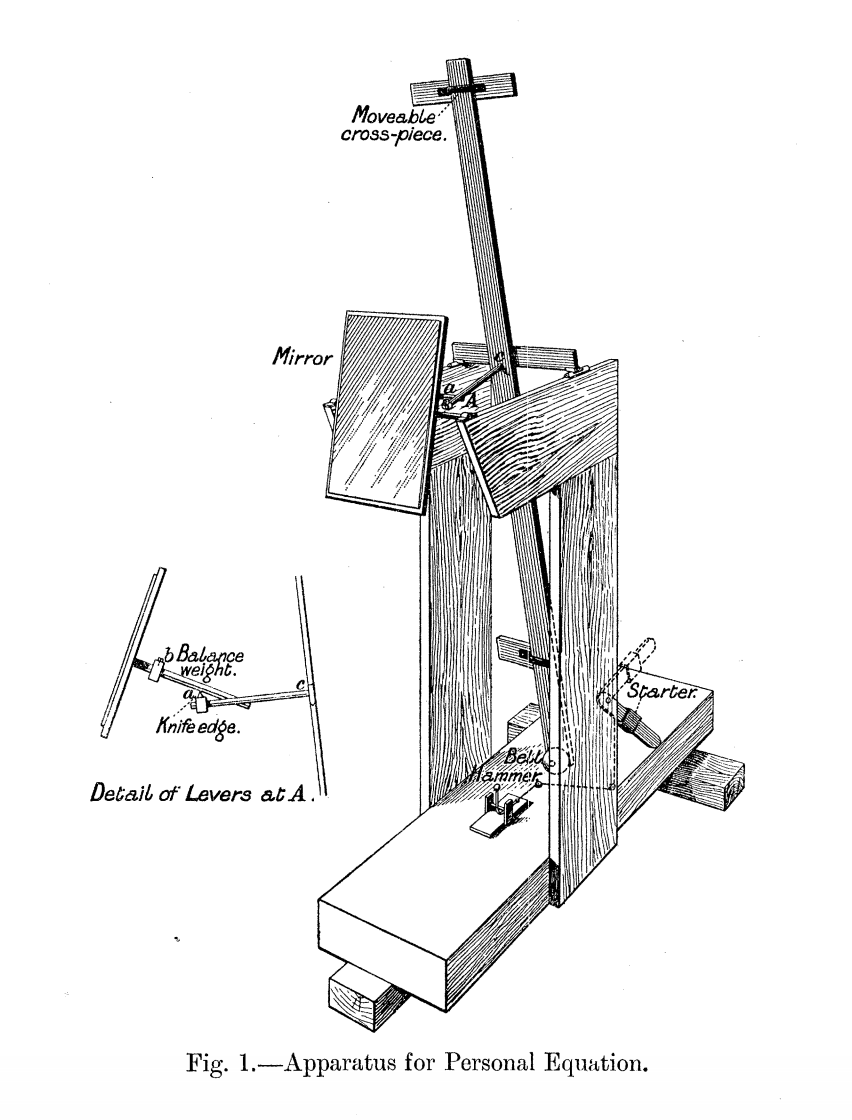
Diagram of an apparatus built by Horace Darwin (under the instruction of Karl Pearson) for measuring reaction time.

Darwin was born in Down House in Kent in 1851, the fifth son and ninth child of the British naturalist Charles Darwin and his wife Emma, and the youngest of their seven children who survived to adulthood.

He was educated at a private school in Woodbridge, Suffolk, and at Trinity College, Cambridge, where he graduated BA in 1874.

In January 1880 Darwin and Emma Cecilia "Ida" Farrer married. She was the daughter of Thomas Farrer, 1st Baron Farrer. They had one son and two daughters:

- Erasmus Darwin IV (7 December 1881 – 24 April 1915) was killed in the Second Battle of Ypres during the First World War.
- Ruth Frances Darwin (1883–1972), married Dr. William Rees-Thomas, was a notable advocate of eugenics.
- Emma Nora Darwin (1885–1989) plant geneticist, edited the 1959 edition of The Autobiography of Charles Darwin and married the civil servant Sir Alan Barlow.

He is buried at the Parish of the Ascension Burial Ground in Cambridge with his wife; his brother Sir Francis Darwin is interred in the same graveyard. His other brother Sir George Darwin is buried in the Trumpington Extension Cemetery, Cambridge.

His family home, "the Orchard", in Huntingdon Road, Cambridge, is now the site of Murray Edwards College.

== Career ==
In 1881 he co-founded the Cambridge Scientific Instrument Company with Albert George Dew-Smith. Darwin led the company when the partnership ended in 1891. He was Mayor of Cambridge between 1896 and 1897, became a Fellow of the Royal Society in 1903 and was knighted in 1918.
