= Horace Barlow =

British vision scientist (1921–2020)

- Born: Horace Basil Barlow; 8 December 1921
- Died: 5 July 2020 (aged 98)
- Education: Winchester College

Horace Basil Barlow FRS (8 December 1921 – 5 July 2020) was a British vision scientist.

== Early life ==
Barlow was the son of the civil servant Sir Alan Barlow and his wife Lady Nora (granddaughter of the naturalist Charles Darwin). Barlow was the great-grandson of Charles Darwin and thus part of the Darwin — Wedgwood family.

He was educated at Winchester College where he met and befriended Freeman Dyson. Barlow read natural sciences at Trinity College, Cambridge and earned an M.D. at Harvard University in 1946.

== Research ==
In 1953, Barlow discovered that the frog brain has neurons which fire in response to specific visual stimuli. This was a precursor to the work of Hubel and Wiesel on visual receptive fields in the visual cortex. He conducted a long study of visual inhibition, the process whereby a neuron firing in response to one group of retinal cells can inhibit the firing of another neuron; this allows perception of relative contrast.

In 1961, Barlow wrote a seminal article where he asked what the computational aims of the visual system are. He concluded that one of the main aims of visual processing is the reduction of redundancy, which has been extended to the efficient coding hypothesis. While the brightnesses of neighbouring points in images are usually very similar, the retina reduces this redundancy. His work thus was central to the field of statistics of natural scenes that relates the statistics of images of real world scenes to the properties of the nervous system.

Barlow also worked in the field of factorial codes. The goal was to encode images with statistically redundant components or pixels such that the code components are statistically independent. Such codes are hard to find but highly useful for purposes such as image classification.

== Awards and distinctions ==
Barlow was a fellow of Trinity College, University of Cambridge. He was elected a Fellow of the Royal Society in 1969 and was awarded their Royal Medal in 1993. He received the 1993 Australia Prize (along with Peter Bishop and Vernon Mountcastle) for his research into the mechanisms of visual perception, and the 2009 Swartz Prize for Theoretical and Computational Neuroscience from the Society for Neuroscience. He was awarded the first Ken Nakayama Prize from the Vision Sciences Society in 2016.

== Personal life ==
Barlow was married twice and fathered seven children. In 1954, he married Ruthala Salaman, daughter of M.H. Salaman. They had four daughters: Rebecca, Natasha, Naomi and Emily. They were divorced in 1970. In 1980, he married Miranda, daughter of John Weston-Smith. They had one son, Oscar, and two daughters, Ida and Pepita.

Barlow died on 5 July 2020, at the age of 98.

== Selected publications ==
- H. B. Barlow. Possible principles underlying the transformation of sensory messages. Sensory Communication, pp. 217–234, 1961
- H. B. Barlow. Single units and sensation: A neuron doctrine for perceptual psychology? Perception 1(4) 371 – 394, 1972
- H. B. Barlow, T. P. Kaushal, and G. J. Mitchison. Finding minimum entropy codes. Neural Computation, 1:412-423, 1989.
