= Alan Barlow =

British art collector and civil servant

Sir Alan Barlow Bt
- Sir Alan Barlow, 2nd Baronet in 1938

Principal Private Secretary to the Prime Minister
- In office 1933–1934
- Prime Minister: Ramsay MacDonald
- Preceded by: Sir Patrick Duff
- Succeeded by: Sir Harold Vincent

Personal details
- Born: James Alan Noel Barlow; 25 December 1881 London, England
- Died: 28 February 1968 (aged 86)
- Spouse: Nora Darwin (m. 1911)
- Children: 6
- Parent: Sir Thomas Barlow (Father)
- Education: Marlborough College, Corpus Christi College, Oxford
- Occupation: Civil servant
- Awards: CBE (1918); CB (1928); KBE (1938); KCB (1942); GCB (1947)

Sir James Alan Noel Barlow, 2nd Baronet GCB KBE FSA (25 December 1881 – 28 February 1968) was a British civil servant and collector of Islamic and Chinese art. He was Principal Private Secretary to Ramsay MacDonald, 1933–1934, and later Under-secretary at HM Treasury.

== Personal life and education ==
Barlow was born in London, the eldest son of Sir Thomas Barlow, 1st Baronet, Royal physician, and his wife, Ada Dalmahoy. He attended Marlborough College and Corpus Christi College, Oxford, graduating with a first class degree in literae humaniores in 1904.

In 1911, Barlow and Nora Darwin, the daughter of Horace Darwin and grand-daughter of Charles Darwin (see Darwin — Wedgwood family) were married. They had six children:

- Joan Helen Barlow (26 May 1912 – 21 February 1954).
- Sir Thomas Erasmus Barlow, 3rd Baronet (23 January 1914 – 12 October 2003), naval officer.
- Erasmus Darwin Barlow (15 April 1915 – 2 August 2005).
- Andrew Dalmahoy Barlow (16 September 1916 – 2006), son: Martin T. Barlow, mathematician.
- Hilda Horatia Barlow (14 September 1919 – 1 February 2017) husband: John Hunter Padel, psychoanalyst; daughter: Ruth Padel, poet.
- Horace Basil Barlow (8 December 1921 – 5 July 2020).

He was a member of the Savile and Athenaeum clubs in London where he was able to meet political contacts during his career. He started collecting Islamic pottery and Chinese ceramics as a child and later donated pieces to museums and the University of Sussex. He was a bibliophile and interested in archaeology. From 1948-55 he was a trustee of the National Gallery, and its chair from 1949-51. He was also a president of the Oriental Ceramic Society from 1943-64.

== Career ==
He began a career as a civil servant as a clerk in the House of Commons in 1906. He was then chosen as a junior examiner in the Board of Education and in 1914 became private secretary to the parliamentary secretary. The First World War altered the direction of his career since in 1915 he was moved to the Ministry of Munitions to be private secretary to Christopher Addison, who became the Minister. In 1917, he was promoted to be deputy controller of labour supply and, in 1918, became controller of the labour department. When the war ended he was in charge of demobilization and training in the new Ministry of Labour. In 1924, he was promoted to principal assistant secretary in charge of the industrial relations department of the Ministry. His role focused on training after 1929 and the establishment of government training centres, although there remained a lack of training by industry.

In 1933 he was appointed as the principal private secretary to Ramsay MacDonald, the prime minister. However, the two men were not suited to each other and in 1934 Barlow was transferred to the Treasury where he remained, rising to a senior position and being a member of several committees that together were concerned with the machinery of government. It has been considered that he made creative changes that improved the civil service. However he did not lead on changes needed as the government intervened more in economic and social policy from the late 1940s onwards. He was in favour of education expenditure, especially in technical and scientific areas. He chaired a committee in 1945-46 that recommended foundation of a new technological university and increasing the number of science graduates, but it was not implemented. He retired in 1948 but continued to be a member of the Advisory Council on Scientific Policy.

Barlow was a knight three times over; a baronet and a knight of both the Order of the Bath and the Order of the British Empire:

- 1918 New Year Honours awarded CBE
- 1928 New Year Honours awarded CB
- The King's Birthday Honours 1938 awarded KBE
- The King's Birthday Honours 1942 awarded KCB
- 1947 New Year Honours awarded GCB

Baronetage of the United Kingdom
Preceded by Thomas Barlow	Baronet (of Wimpole Street); 1945–1968	Succeeded by Thomas Erasmus Barlow
Government offices
Preceded by Sir Patrick Duff	Principal Private Secretary to the Prime Minister; 1933–1934	Succeeded by Sir Harold Vincent
