= The Higher Pantheism =

"The Higher Pantheism" is an 1867 poem by Alfred, Lord Tennyson, in which Tennyson presents a view of God as subsisting throughout the material world. The poem drew both praise and criticism, as well as examination of its inspirations in the words of Tennyson's contemporaries.

The poem was presented at the inaugural meeting of the Metaphysical Society, of which Tennyson was a member, in 1869. Tennyson himself was unable to attend the event, so the poem was read by James Knowles.

== Examinations ==
The poem has been compared to passages from the philosophy of Thomas Carlyle, a longtime friend and confidante of Tennyson's.

British Nonconformist divine Robert Forman Horton wrote that while "some of the older theologians" suspected Tennyson of literal pantheism, "The Higher Pantheism" "does not say that the All (Pan) is God, but that the All is a shadow of God whom we are at present too imperfect to apprehend." This is most evident in the closing lines of the poem:

And the ear of man cannot hear, and the eye of man cannot see;
But if we could see and hear, this Vision—were it not He?

Notably, towards the end of his life, Tennyson revealed that his "religious beliefs also defied convention, leaning towards agnosticism and pandeism". Horton compared the poem to a remark Tennyson made to Frederick Locker-Lampson during a visit to the Alps:

Perhaps this earth, and all that is on it,-storms, mountains, cataracts, the sun and the skies,-are the Almighty; in fact, such is our petty nature, we cannot see Him, but we see His shadow, as it were, a distorted shadow; possibly at this moment there may be beings, invisible to us, who see the Almighty more clearly than we do. For instance, we have five senses; if we had been born with only one our ideas of nature would have been very different from what they are.

Algernon Charles Swinburne was not so appreciative of the poem; he called it a "gabble and babble of half-hatched thoughts in half-baked words," and wrote a parody titled "The Higher Pantheism in a Nutshell", copying the meter but with verses making absurd truisms. Swinburne's version concluded:

God, whom we see not, is: and God, who is not, we see:
Fiddle, we know, is diddle: and diddle, we take it, is dee.
