= Homer W. Smith =

American physiologist and science writer (1895–1962)

Homer William Smith
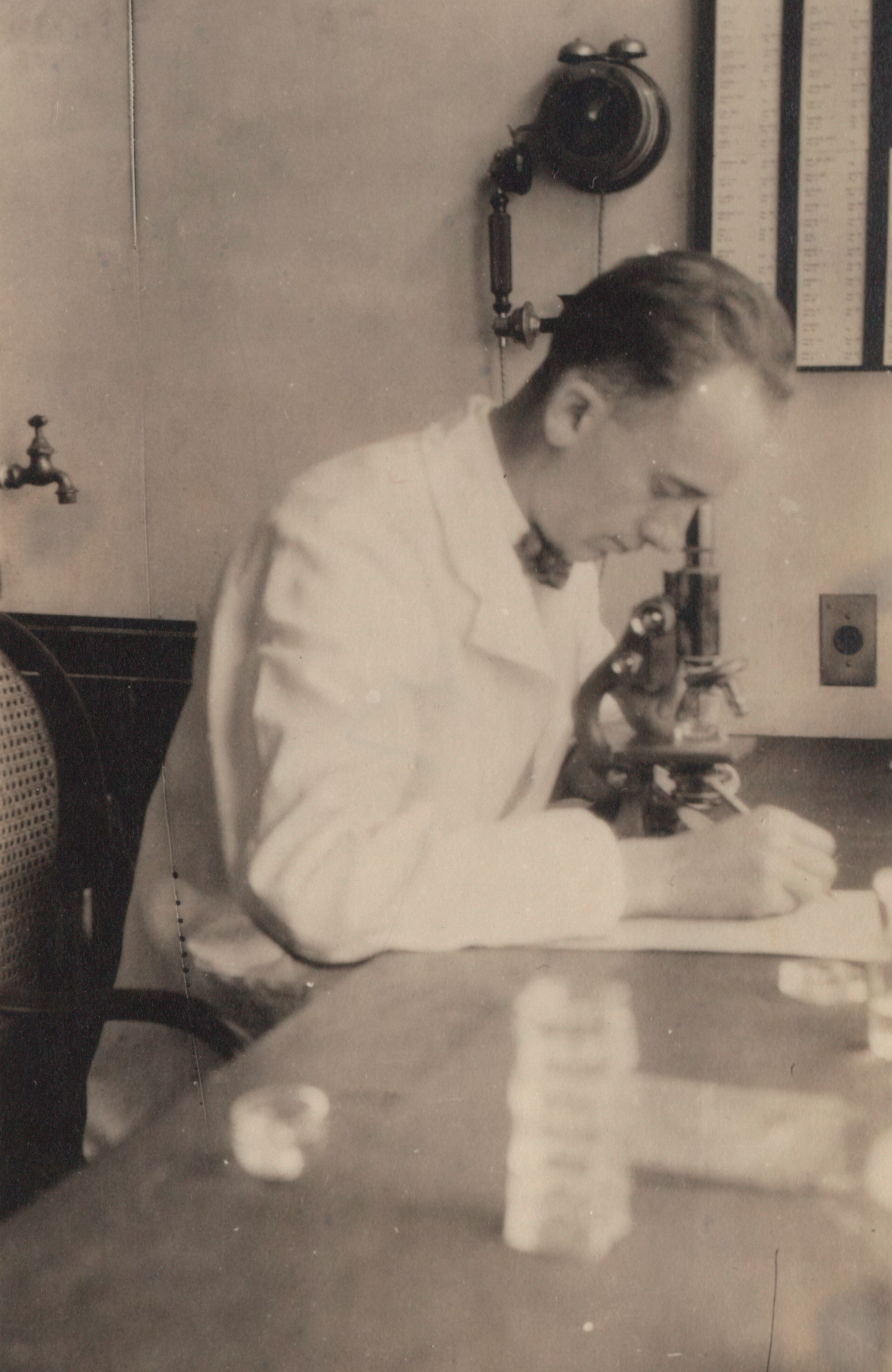
- Born: January 2, 1895; Denver, Colorado
- Died: March 25, 1962 (aged 67); New York City
- Education: Johns Hopkins University (DSc 1921)
- Known for: Study of kidney function
- Scientific career
- Fields: Physiologist, science writer
- Workplaces: New York University School of Medicine

Homer William Smith (January 2, 1895 – March 25, 1962) was an American physiologist and science writer known for his experiments on the kidney and philosophical writings on natural history and the theory of evolution. Smith was an agnostic and a proponent of the Christ myth theory.

== Biography ==
Smith was born on January 2, 1895, in Denver, and three years later, his family moved to Cripple Creek, Colorado, which was included in both the Cripple Creek miners' strike of 1894 and the Colorado Labor Wars of 1903–04. He had a stutter from about the age of five, to which he attributes his introspectiveness. Smith's mother died by the time he was seven; he had five older siblings at the time, the oldest of which was 26. Smith describes his father as "of the generation that had one foot still planted in religious tradition, the other planted in irreligious rationalism. ... For his mixed sentiment and skepticism my father paid off his conscience by generous hospitality, and any minister of any gospel was welcome at his table."

At the age of eleven, while Smith had the measles, his father built him a shed in which he could conduct scientific experiments; these involved chemistry and microbiology, as well as the use of a vacuum pump, telegraph, static machine, X-ray tube, and Tesla coil. He also dissected cats, which fueled his interest for biology and diminished his faith in anthropocentrism. As a result of the apathy he felt following the sinking of the RMS Titanic on April 15, 1912, he set out on a philosophical quest of reading and writing with a renewed focus towards scholarship.

Smith received his D.Sc in 1921 from Johns Hopkins University School of Hygiene and Public Health. From 1928 until his retirement in 1961 he was the Professor of Physiology and Director of the Physiological Laboratories at New York University School of Medicine. Smith was a leader in the field of renal physiology. His elegant experiments on the kidney in the 1930s proved beyond any doubt that it operated according to physical principles, both as a filter and a secretory organ, eliminating the last vestige of vitalism in physiology. He used inulin (at the same time as A. N. Richards) to measure how much kidney filtrate is formed. His book The Kidney: Structure and Function in Health and Disease (1951) was an authoritative summary of what was known at that time.

Komongo or, the Lungfish and the Padre (1932) takes place in the Suez Canal where a scientist returning to the United States with a cargo of lungfish for kidney experiments delivers a monologue to an Anglican Minister on how evolution shapes organisms. The book, after being personally rejected by Alfred A. Knopf, was accepted by Viking Press. It became a Book of the Month, was included in The Woollcott Reader (1935), and republished as a Pocket Overseas Edition for the troops during World War II, and then made a monthly selection by the Natural History Book Club. For the latter republication, the book had to be reset, as the original plates had been donated during the metal shortages of 1943–44. Smith desired to make changes to the book, which the publisher gave him a week to make. (Note: The changes mainly involved less dialogue from Joel and a little bit more from the Padre near the end of the book.)

The manuscript for Man and His Gods (1952), which Smith describes as "a simple story of man's changing ideas about himself and his place in nature," was declined by several publishers and reduced from about 275,000 to 250,000 words before it was accepted by Little, Brown and Company. The publisher made further cuts for length, which Smith approved of. It considers "man's ideas about the supernatural in the perspective of the evolution of western theology and philosophy from the ancient Egyptians to the nineteenth century", culminating in Darwin's theory of evolution and the reaction to it, including the thoughts of Thomas Henry Huxley and the relationship of modern thought to that of pre-evolutionist philosophers John Locke, David Hume and Immanuel Kant. (Note: While the body of the book lacks footnotes, a considerable bibliography is provided in the afterword.) Albert Einstein says in the foreword:

The work is a broadly conceived attempt to portray man's fear-induced animistic and mythic ideas with all their far-flung transformations and interrelations. It relates the impact of these phantasmagorias on human destiny and the causal relationships by which they have come to be crystallized into organized religion. This is a biologist speaking whose scientific training has disciplined him in a grim objectivity rarely found in the pure historian.

From Fish to Philosopher (1953) explains how evolutionary history accounts for the seemingly bewildering mammalian kidney, in which water, salts, and small molecules are filtered from the blood into kidney tubules and then much of the water and salt and many of the small molecules are pumped back into the blood stream. He argues that vertebrates originated in fresh water, where water was drawn into their bodies by the osmotic pressure of their body fluids; their kidneys excreted the extra water while also retrieving their supply of small solutes.

Smith served on the board of trustees of Science Service, now known as Society for Science & the Public, from 1952–1955.

Smith died on March 25, 1962, at the age of 67.

As a memorial to Smith in 1963 the New York Heart Association created the Homer W. Smith Award in Renal Physiology. Additionally, the American Society of Nephrology established The Homer Smith Award in 1964. The award is presented annually to an individual who has made outstanding contributions which fundamentally affect the science of nephrology, broadly defined, but not limited to, the pathobiology, cellular and molecular mechanisms and genetic influences on the functions and diseases of the kidney.

Homer Smith was married to Margaret Wilson, who was the daughter of Lily and James Robert Wilson from Spring City, Tennessee. His son was Homer Wilson Smith.

== Views on religion ==
Smith attacked superstition and was critical of religious ideas. He was agnostic and an advocate of the Christ myth theory.

== Publications ==
- Kamongo, or The Lungfish and the Padre (1932)
- The Kidney: Structure and Function in Health and Disease (1951)
- Man and His Gods (1952) [with foreword by Albert Einstein]
- From Fish to Philosopher (1953)

== Quotes ==
- "What engineer, wishing to regulate the composition of the internal environment of the body on which the function of every bone, gland, muscle, and nerve depends, would devise a scheme that operated by throwing the whole thing out 16 times a day and rely on grabbing from it, as it fell to earth, only those precious elements which he wanted to keep?"
