= John Langton Sanford =

British writer

- Born: 22 June 1824; London, England, United Kingdom
- Died: 27 July 1877 (aged 53); Evesham, England, United Kingdom
- Education: University College London
- Occupation: Writer

John Langton Sanford (22 June 1824 – 27 July 1877) was an English historical writer.

== Life ==
Born at Upper Clapton, London, on 22 June 1824, Sanford studied at University College London. Entering Lincoln's Inn, he read in the chambers of John Richard Quain, and was called to the bar in 1855, but never practised as a barrister.

From 1852 to the end of 1855 Sanford was joint editor of The Inquirer, established as a Unitarian periodical in 1842. From 1861 till his death he contributed to The Spectator. Among his close friends were Walter Bagehot and William Caldwell Roscoe.

For many years Sanford's eyesight was failing, and early in 1875 he became totally blind. After the death of his sister Lucy he moved, in May 1876, from London to Evesham, Worcestershire. He died at Evesham on 27 July 1877, and was buried in the graveyard of Oat Street Chapel.

== Works ==
Sanford wrote:

- Studies and Illustrations of the Great Rebellion (1858), some of which had appeared originally in the Christian Reformer, under the signature "Sigma".
- The Great Governing Families of England (1865, 2 vols.), written with Meredith Townsend, and originally contributed to The Spectator.
- Estimates of the English Kings from William 'the Conqueror' to George III (1872), also reproduced from The Spectator.

== Notes ==
=== Attribution ===
This article incorporates text from a publication now in the public domain: Lee, Sidney, ed. (1897). "Sanford, John Langton". Dictionary of National Biography. Vol. 50. London: Smith, Elder & Co.

John Langton Sanford in libraries (WorldCat catalog)
