= National Review (disambiguation) =

National Review is an American biweekly contemporary political magazine founded in 1955.

National Review may also refer to:

- National Review (London) (1883–1960), called National and English Review (1950–1960), a defunct London publication
- National Review (1855) (1855–1864), a defunct London publication

== See also ==
- National Review Board (founded 2002), the "National Review Board for the Protection of Children and Young People" created by American Bishops
- National Board of Review (founded 1909), the USA "National Board of Review of Motion Pictures"
