= Lombard Street, London =

Street in the City of London

Coordinates: 51.5125°N 0.0869°W

Lombard Street
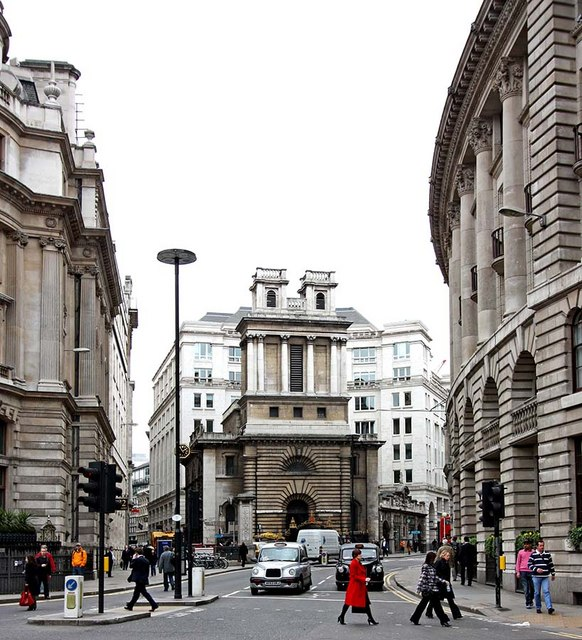
- Lombard Street from Bank junction. The street continues to the left of St Mary Woolnoth church; to the right is King William Street.
- Maintained by: City of London Corporation
- Length: 260 m (850 ft)
- Addresses: 1 to 82
- Location: London, United Kingdom
- Postal code: EC3
- Nearest train station: Bank
- Northwest end: Bank junction
- Major junctions: King William Street
- Southeast end: Gracechurch Street

Other
- Known for: Banking
- Status: Unclassified

Lombard Street (/ˈlɒmbərd, -bɑːrd/) is a street notable for its connections with the City of London's merchant, banking and insurance industries, stretching back to medieval times.

From Bank junction, where nine streets converge by the Bank of England, Lombard Street runs southeast for a short distance before bearing left into a more easterly direction, and terminates at a junction with Gracechurch Street and Fenchurch Street. Its overall length is 260 metres (280 yd).

It has often been compared with Wall Street in New York City. In 1952, William L. Shirer wrote that in the 1920s "Wall Street was replacing Lombard Street as the financial capital of the world."

== Description ==
Lombard Street, since the construction of King William Street, has two distinct sections. The short section between Bank junction and the church of St Mary Woolnoth is relatively wide, and carries two-way traffic including several bus routes, which continues along King William Street. Lombard Street bears to the east and the remainder is much narrower (retaining its medieval character) and is one-way.

At the eastern end of the street, there are a number of modern buildings on both sides, in contrast to the older buildings and architectural styles along much of its length. Built in 1990–92, the former headquarters of Barclays covers a large plot on the north corner of Lombard and Gracechurch streets, and is the largest and tallest building in the immediate vicinity of Lombard Street, at 87 metres (285 ft) high.

Addresses on the street are numbered 1 to 40 along the south side, running from Bank to Gracechurch Street, then 41 to 82 along the north side, from Gracechurch Street to Bank. The postcodes for the street start with EC3V.

The nearest London Underground stations to Lombard Street are Bank and Monument; one of the numerous entrances to Bank station is on Lombard Street itself. Mainline railway stations at Cannon Street and Fenchurch Street are also close by.

The street runs downhill towards Bank, being on the eastern side of the Walbrook valley. At its junction with Gracechurch Street it is at an elevation of 16.7 metres (55 ft), whilst at its junction at Bank it is at 13.5 metres (44 ft).

Side streets and alleys run towards Cornhill to the north, and Cannon Street to the south. Running north are Pope's Head Alley, Change Alley, Birchin Lane and George Yard. Heading south are St Swithin's Lane, Post Office Court, Abchurch Lane, Nicholas Lane, Clement's Lane and Plough Court.

== History ==
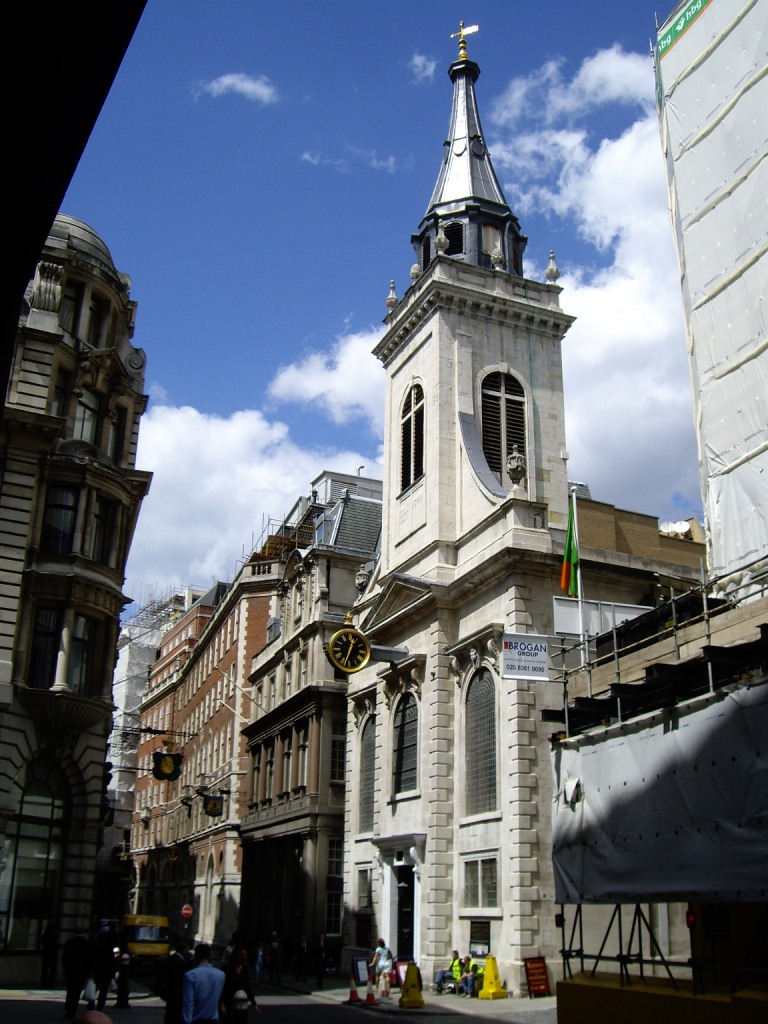
Church of St Edmund, King and Martyr

Lombard Street has its origins in one of the main Roman roads of Londinium. It later formed a plot of land granted by King Edward I (1272–1307) to the so-called Lombard bankers, merchants and lenders from northern Italy (a larger area than the modern Lombardy region).

In 1537 Sir Richard Gresham suggested to Lord Privy Seal, Thomas Cromwell that they "make a goodely Bursse in Lombert-streete, for marchuants to repayer unto". From this originated the Royal Exchange built by Sir Richard's son, Thomas.

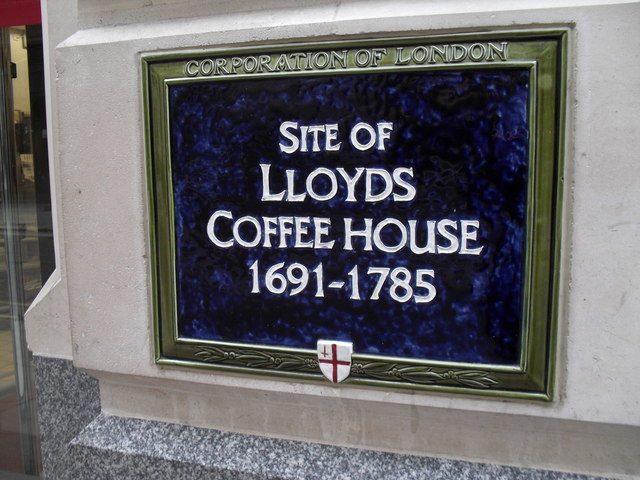
Blue plaque marking the location of Lloyd's Coffee House, notable in the development of the City's insurance market

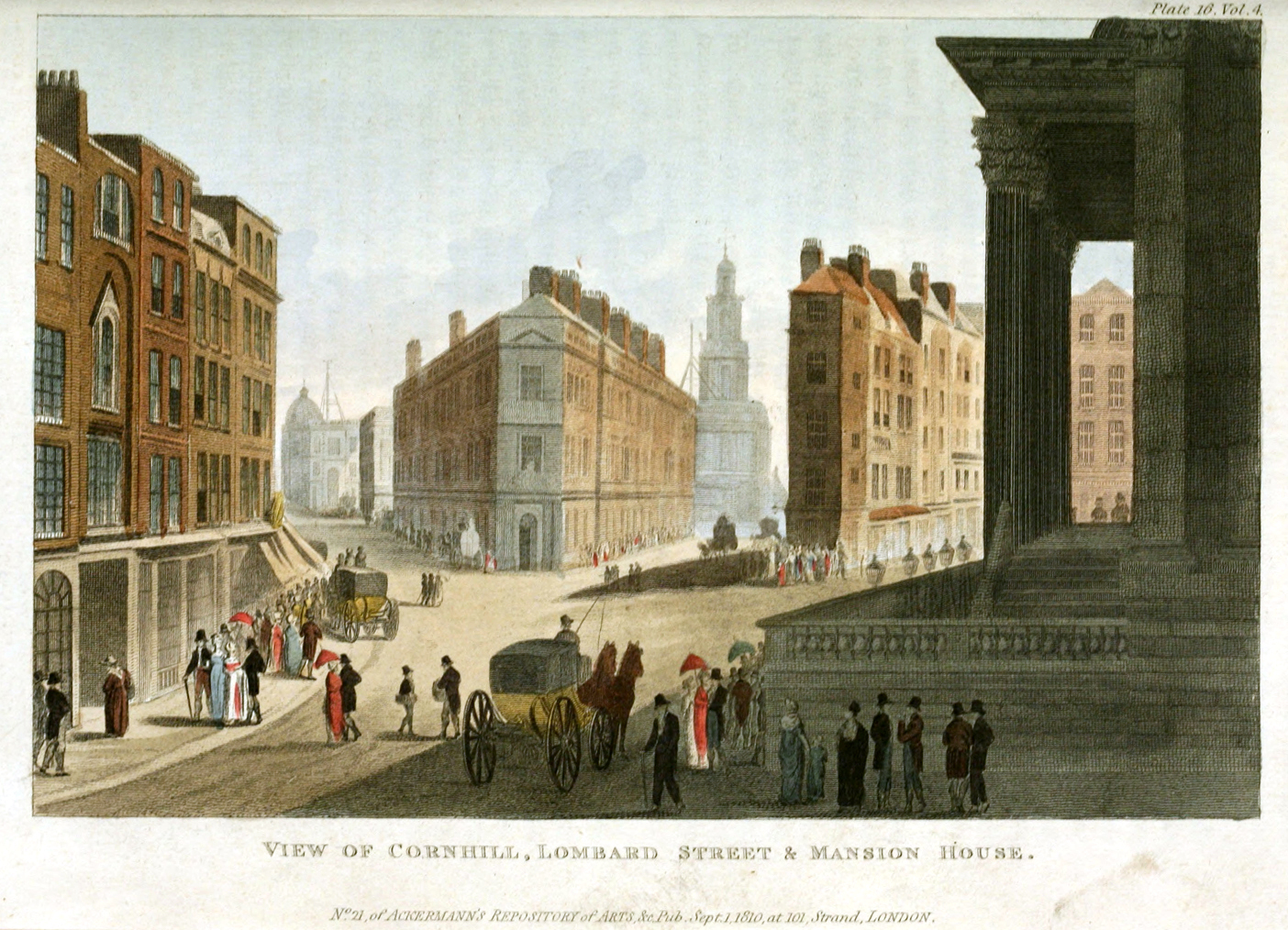
Cornhill, Lombard Street and Mansion House in 1810

In 1540 the English parliament passed an act, the Navigation Act 1540 (32 Hen. 8. c. 14), titled An Acte for The Mayntenaunce of the Navye, that required ship owners to post notice of their sailing in Lombard Street:

And further be it enacted by auctoritie abovesaid, that all and every owner and owners maistre and maisters and other Governers of English shippes or vesselis or any of them, mynding and intending to make any voyage or sayling from the porte of London into the parties of beyond the Sees with his or their Shipp or Vessil, shall make publique notice and declaration of his or their said mynd and intent of sayling and voyage in writing, and affix the same unto some Post or other open place or places in Lombarde strete, there to remayne by the space of seven daies, declaring in the same writing to what Place or Porte he or they shall so intend to sayle and make his or their voyage, and of the name of the Shipp and Shippes in the which he or they intend to sayle.

Lloyd's Coffee House, which eventually became the global insurance market Lloyd's of London, moved to Lombard Street near the General Post Office from Tower Street in 1691. The location, on the south side of the street, is now occupied at street level by a supermarket. Lloyd's is now located in Lime Street, where its current building was completed in 1986.

Until the 1980s, most UK-based banks had their head offices in Lombard Street and historically it has been the London home for money lenders. No. 54 was the long-standing headquarters of Barclays before the financial institution moved in 2005 to One Churchill Place at Canary Wharf. No. 71 was the headquarters of Lloyds Bank, and No. 60 was the headquarters of the Trustee Savings Bank (TSB).

Lombard Street has a number of colourful signs hanging from the buildings, depicting (mostly historic) organisations and buildings once located there. Having previously been banned, the present-day signs were erected for the coronation of Edward VII in 1902.

From 1678 to 1829, the General Post Office had its headquarters on Lombard Street; this is now commemorated by the side-street's name of Post Office Court. The expense of continuously expanding the post office site in the middle of the financial district, however, eventually necessitated a move to St Martins-le-Grand. The slums at the site were cleared in the early 19th century and the General Post Office East was constructed.

=== Churches ===
St Mary Woolnoth is situated on the corner of Lombard Street and King William Street, and continues to be an active parish church. The City & South London Railway had obtained permission to demolish the 18th-century church and build a station (originally proposed to be named "Lombard Street") on the site. After public protest, the company changed its plans to build only a sub-surface ticket hall and lift entrance in the crypt of the church. This necessitated moving the bodies elsewhere, strengthening the crypt with a steel framework and underpinning the church's foundations.

The church of St Edmund, King and Martyr also stands on the street, on the north side close to Gracechurch Street. Destroyed during the Great Fire of London in 1666, St Edmund's was rebuilt during the 1670s by Christopher Wren. It is no longer used for regular worship, though, and now performs service as the London Centre for Spirituality.

A third church existed, until its demolition in 1937, near the junction of Gracechurch Street, known as All Hallows Lombard Street. The site now forms part of the plot occupied by the former Barclays bank. Ball Alley (which also no longer exists) connected the church with Lombard Street and George Yard.

=== Wards ===
Historically, Lombard Street was one of the principal streets (along with Fenchurch Street) of the ward of Langbourn, forming the core of the ward's West division. Boundary changes in 2003 and 2013 have resulted in most of the northern side remaining in Langbourn, whilst the southern side is now largely in the ward of Candlewick.

The changes of 2013 now mean that all of the southern side of the street, with the notable exception of the guild— or ward—church of St Mary Woolnoth, is in Candlewick (from 2003 to 2013 Candlewick extended only to Abchurch Lane). Also with the 2013 changes, the ward of Walbrook now includes the northern side from No. 68 to Bank junction. Prior to 2003 and again since 2013 Walbrook includes the far western corner of Lombard Street, on the corner with Mansion House Place.

== Language and literature ==
In old literature, it is generally written as "Lombard-street". The spacing and the capitalisation of Street were not common in British English until the second half of the 20th century.

In his diary of the 1660s, Samuel Pepys mentions "Lumbard street" many times; there is a chart with links to these references.

"All Lombard Street to a China orange" is an old-fashioned idiom meaning very heavily weighted odds; "Lombard-street" signifying wealth and "a China orange", poverty. The 'China orange' was used to indicate an item of low value.

Lombard Street: A Description of the Money Market is a book by the economics philosopher Walter Bagehot, published in 1873. Bagehot was one of the first writers to describe and explain the world of international and corporate finance, banking, and money in understandable language. The book was in part a reaction to the 1866 collapse of Overend, Gurney and Company, a bank headquartered at No. 65, Lombard Street.

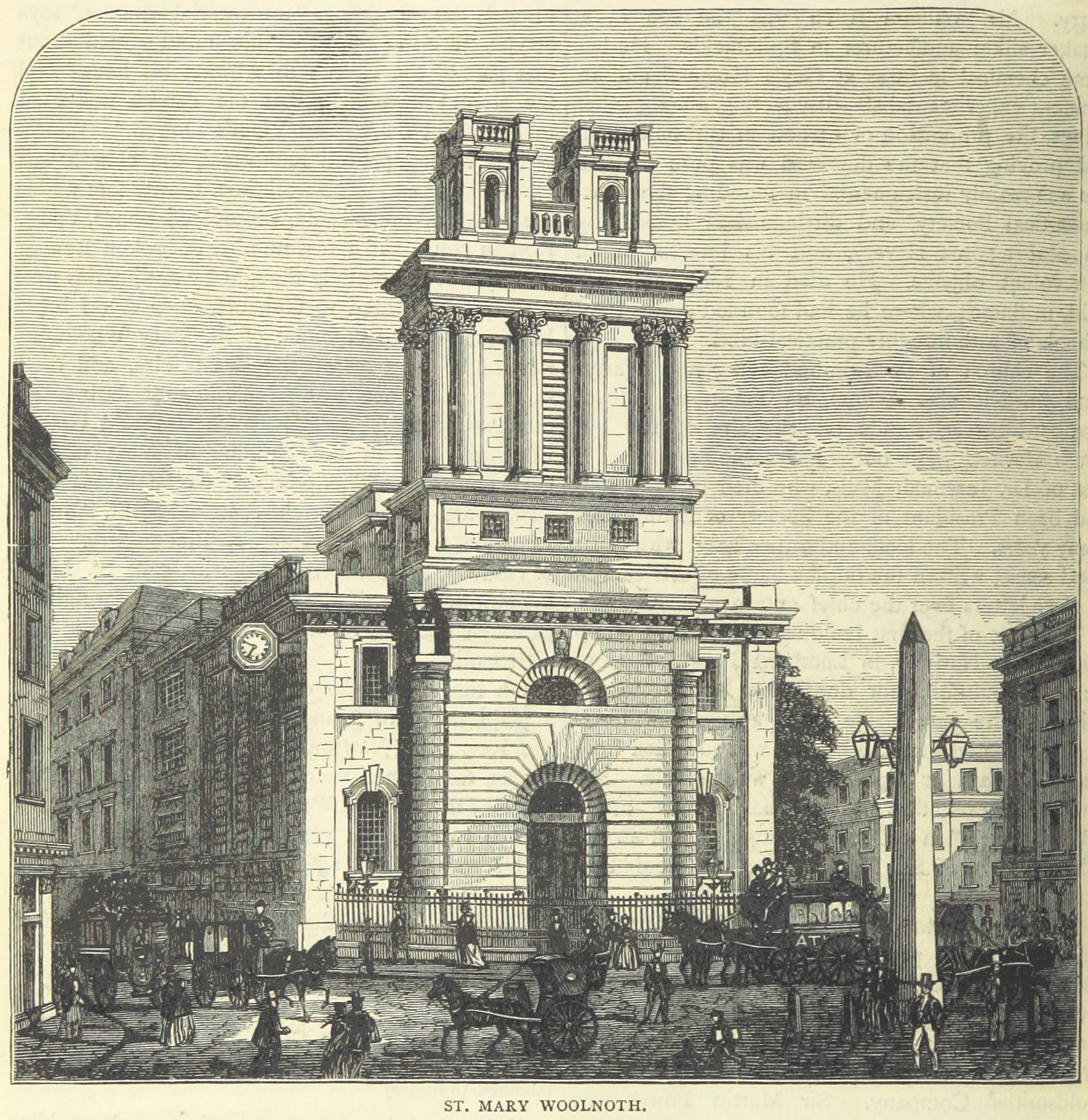
Note the monument outside St Mary Woolnoth, which was taken down and re-erected at Ballard Down in 1892.

Karl Marx mentions Lombard Street in reference to credit and banking in Das Kapital.

== People ==
Gregory de Rokesley, eight-times Lord Mayor of London from 1274 to 1281 and in 1285, lived in a building on the site of what is now No. 72 Lombard Street, and in Pope's Head Alley.

The poet Alexander Pope was born at No. 32 in 1688.

Maria Beadnell, whom the future novelist Charles Dickens courted between 1830 and 1833, lived at No. 2 until her marriage in 1845.

CSM Horace Crabtree, Military Medal Recipient, and family lived at a property formally designated No. 37 Lombard St between 1950 and 1960.

== Gallery ==
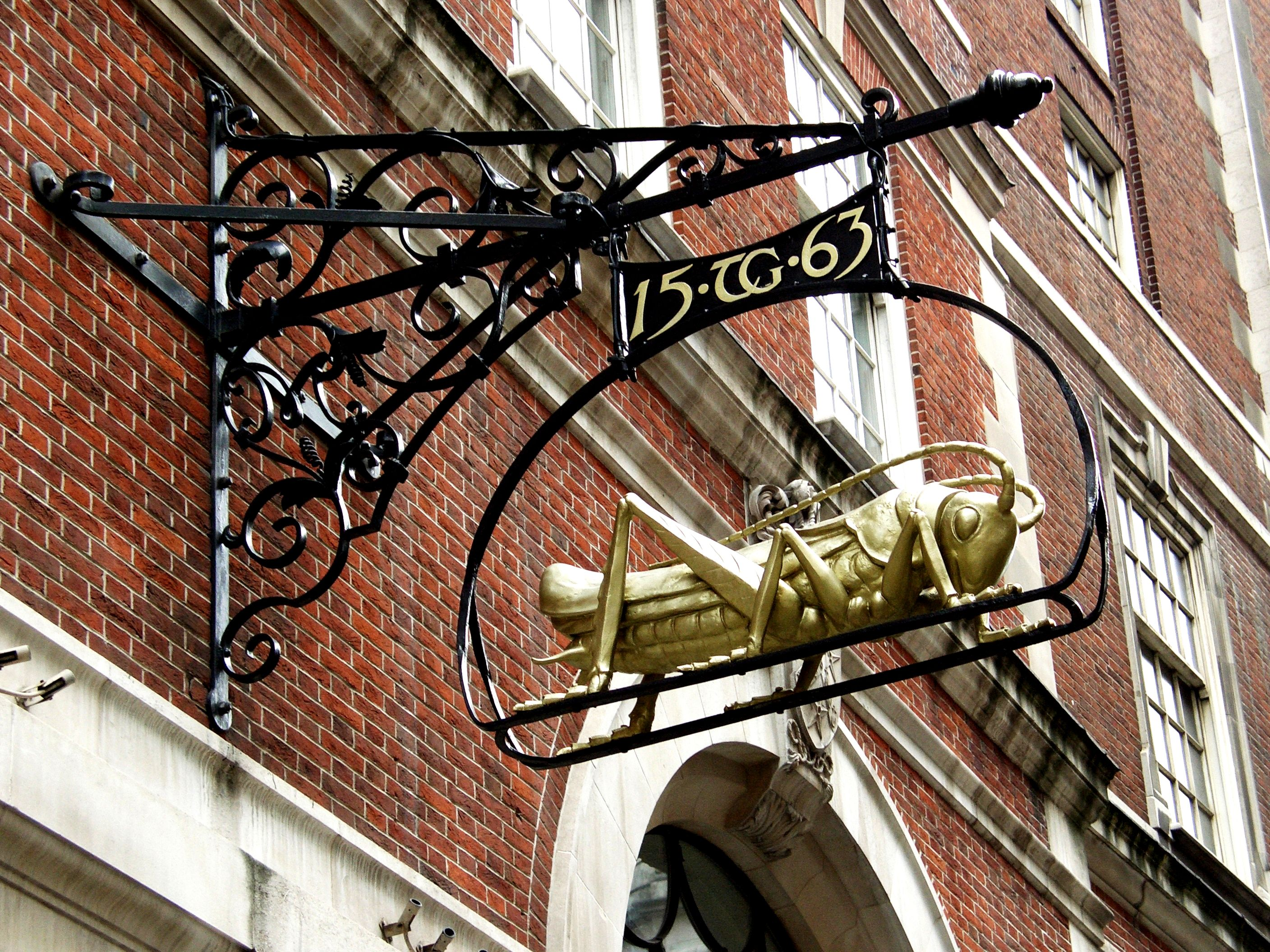
The Gresham grasshopper

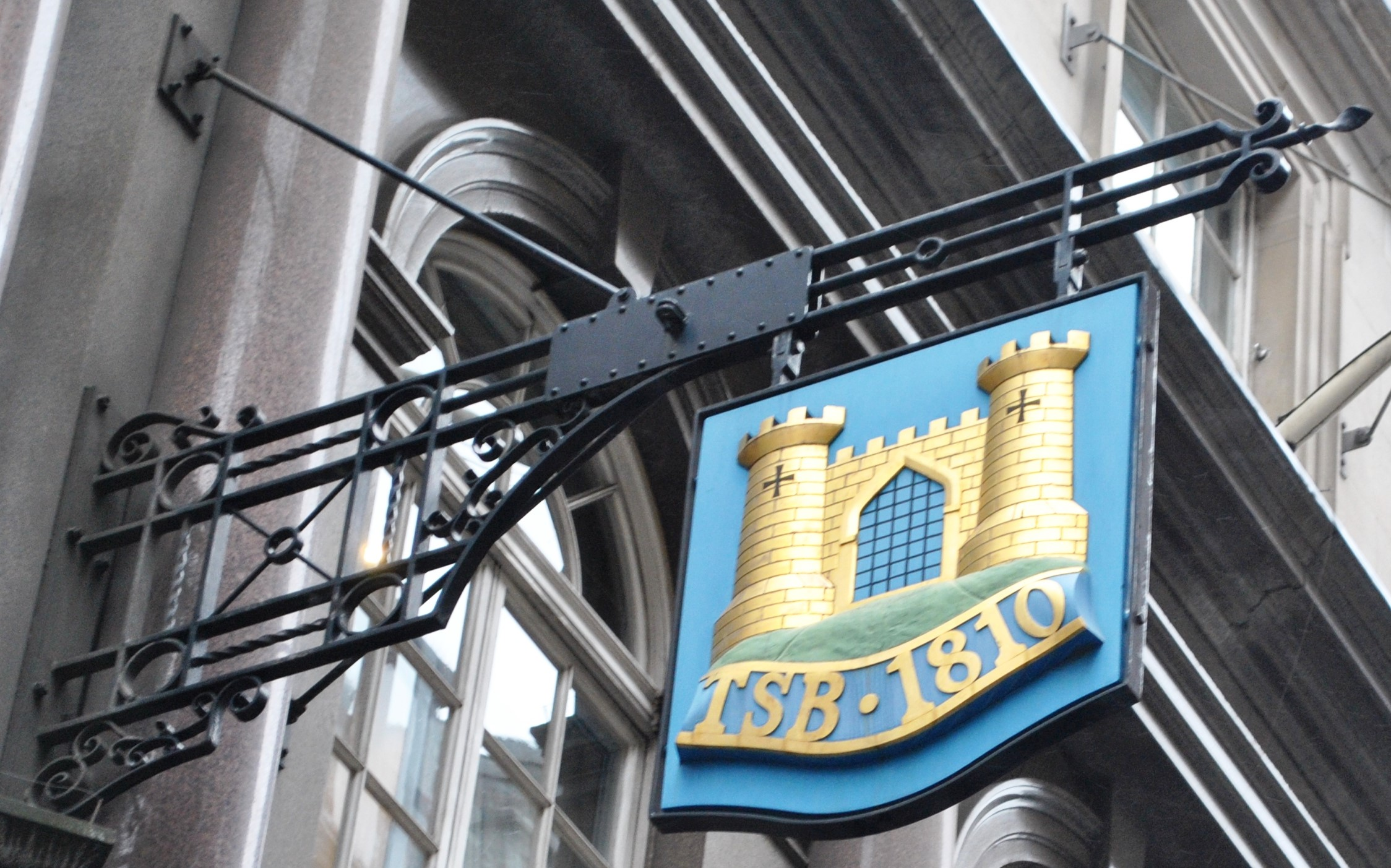

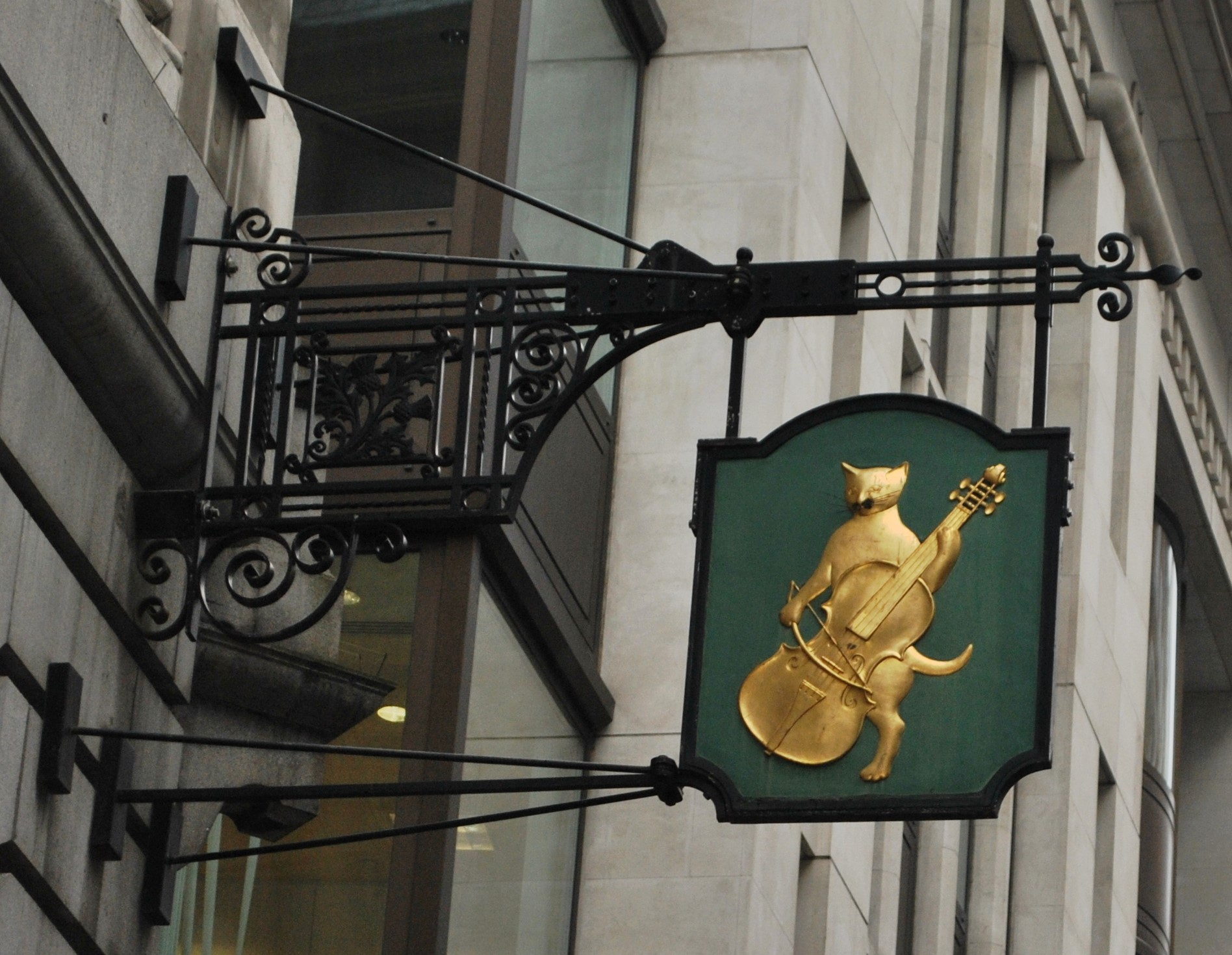

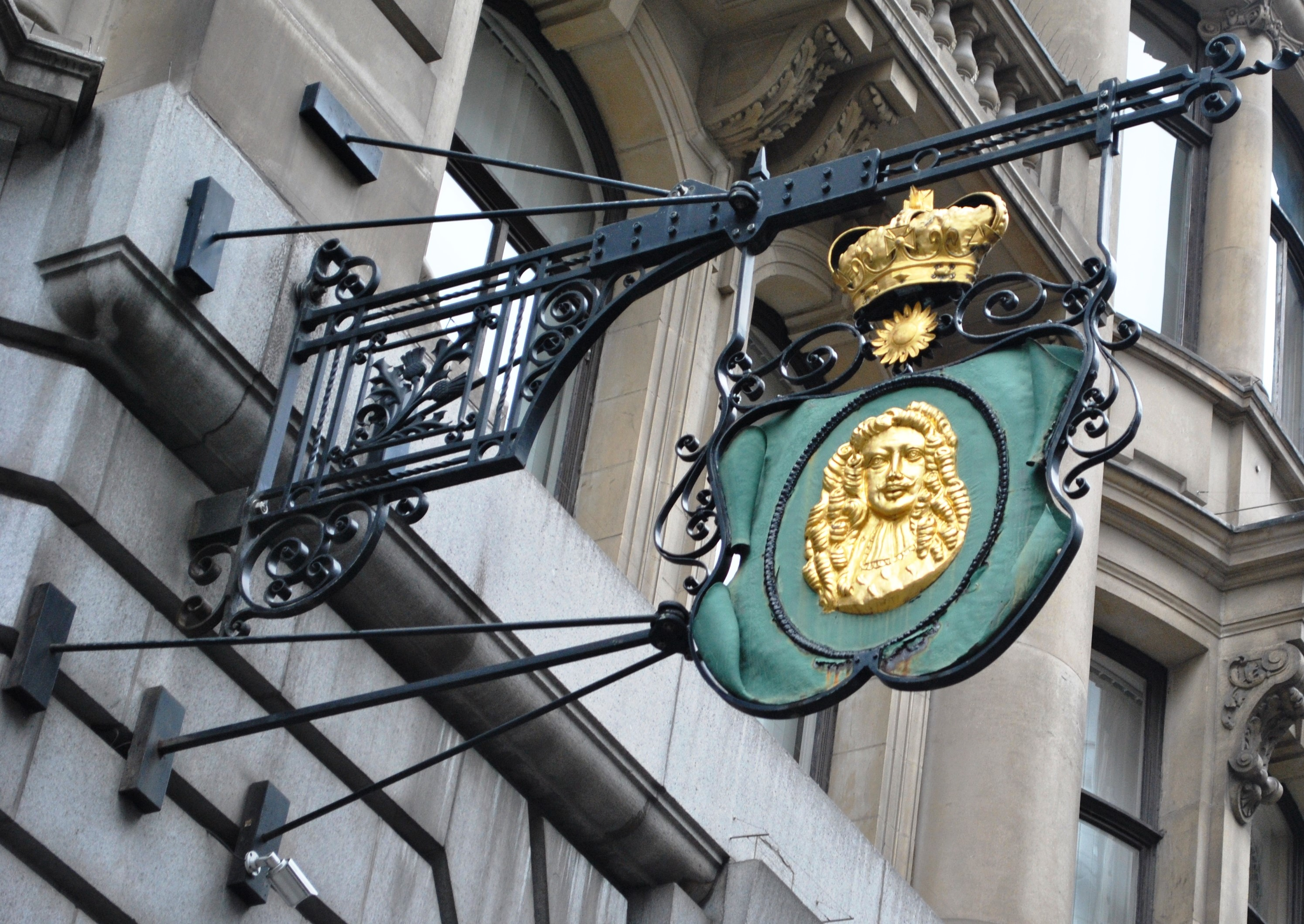

== See also ==
- Lombard banking
- Lombard Street: A Description of the Money Market
