= William Caldwell Roscoe =

English journalist and poet (1823–1859)

William Caldwell Roscoe (1823–1859) was an English journalist and poet.

== Life ==
Born at Liverpool on 20 September 1823, he was son of William Stanley Roscoe and grandson of William Roscoe; his mother Hannah Eliza Caldwell, was daughter of James Caldwell of Linley Wood in Staffordshire, and a sister of Anne Marsh-Caldwell. He was educated at a private school, St. Domingo House, near Liverpool, and then at University College London, graduating in the University of London in 1843.

Roscoe was called to the bar in 1850, but after two years relinquished practice, partly for health reasons, but also from doubts of his qualifications for his profession. He married, and then lived mostly in Wales, where he was interested in slate quarries and spent time writing. He died at Richmond, Surrey of typhoid fever, on 30 July 1859.

== Works ==
Roscoe published two tragedies, Eliduc (1846) and Violenzia (1851, anon.), and much verse. As a journalist he had numerous essays in the Prospective Review, and the National Review, of which his brother-in-law Richard Holt Hutton was editor. These compositions were collected and published in 1860 by Hutton, with a memoir; the poems and dramas were republished in 1891 by his daughter, Elizabeth Mary Roscoe.

== Family ==
Roscoe married in 1855 to Emily, daughter of William Malin of Derby.

== Notes ==
Attribution

This article incorporates text from a publication now in the public domain: Lee, Sidney, ed. (1897). "Roscoe, William Caldwell". Dictionary of National Biography. Vol. 49. London: Smith, Elder & Co.

William Caldwell Roscoe page on the JJ Heath-Caldwell family history website
