= Metaphysical Society =

British debating society

The Metaphysical Society was a famous British debating society, founded in 1869 by James Knowles, who acted as Secretary. Membership was by invitation only, and was exclusively male. Many of its members were prominent clergymen, philosophers, and politicians.

== Overview ==
The society met monthly, from November to July (to mirror the sitting of Parliament). Its members were never all present at once, and most meetings never exceeded twenty attendees. Papers were read and discussed at meetings on such subjects as the ultimate grounds of belief in the objective and moral sciences, the immortality of the soul, etc. A description of one of the meetings was given by William Connor Magee (then Bishop of Peterborough) in a letter on 13 February 1873:

Archbishop Manning in the chair was flanked by two Protestant bishops right and left; on my right was Hutton, editor of the Spectator, an Arian; then came Father Dalgairns, a very able Roman Catholic priest; opposite him Lord A. Russell, a Deist; then two Scotch metaphysical writers, Freethinkers; then Knowles, the very broad editor of the Contemporary; then, dressed as a layman and looking like a country squire, was Ward, formerly Rev. Ward, and earliest of the perverts to Rome; then Greg, author of The Creed of Christendom, a Deist; then Froude, the historian, once a deacon in our Church, now a Deist; then Roden Noël, an actual Atheist and red republican, and looking very like one! Lastly Ruskin, who read a paper on miracles, which we discussed for an hour and a half! Nothing could be calmer, fairer, or even, on the whole, more reverent than the discussion. In my opinion, we, the Christians, had much the best of it. Dalgairns, the priest, was very masterly; Manning, clever and precise and weighty; Froude, very acute, and so was Greg. We only wanted a Jew and a Muslim to make our Religious Museum complete (Life, i. 284).

The last meeting of the society was held on 16 May 1880 and it was dissolved later in November of that year. Huxley said that it died "of too much love"; Tennyson, "because after ten years of strenuous effort no one had succeeded in even defining metaphysics." According to Dean Stanley, "We all meant the same thing if we only knew it."

In 1877 Knowles founded The Nineteenth Century, a literary journal whose editorial style was partly inspired by the debates he had managed at the Metaphysical Society. Many of the society's members became supporters and contributors to the magazine.

== Members ==
The members from first to last were as follows:

- Dean Stanley, of Westminster Abbey
- John Robert Seeley, English essayist and historian.
- Roden Noël, poet
- James Martineau, English philosopher
- William Benjamin Carpenter, physiologist and naturalist
- James Hinton, surgeon and author
- Thomas Henry Huxley, Darwinist biologist
- John Tyndall, physicist
- Charles Pritchard, astronomer
- Richard Holt Hutton, writer and theologian.
- William George Ward, Catholic theologian
- Walter Bagehot, economist and editor
- James Anthony Froude, historian
- Alfred, Lord Tennyson, Poet Laureate
- Alfred Barry
- Lord Arthur Russell, British politician
- William Ewart Gladstone, Liberal Prime Minister
- Henry Edward Manning, Archbishop and Cardinal
- James Knowles, architect and editor
- John Lubbock, 1st Baron Avebury
- Henry Alford, churchman, scholar, and poet
- Sir Alexander Grant
- Connop Thirlwall
- Frederic Harrison
- Father Dalgairns
- Sir George Grove
- Shadworth Hodgson
- Henry Sidgwick
- Edmund Lushington
- Bishop Charles Ellicott
- Mark Pattison
- George Campbell, 8th Duke of Argyll
- John Ruskin
- Robert Lowe, 1st Viscount Sherbrooke
- Sir Mountstuart Elphinstone Grant-Duff
- William Rathbone Greg
- Alexander Campbell Fraser
- Henry Acland
- John Frederick Denison Maurice
- Archbishop Thomson
- Thomas Mozely
- Richard William Church
- William Connor Magee
- George Croom Robertson
- James Fitzjames Stephen
- James Joseph Sylvester, mathematician
- John Charles Bucknill
- Andrew Clark
- William Kingdon Clifford, mathematician and expert on non-Euclidean geometry
- St. George Jackson Mivart
- Matthew Piers Watt Boulton, classicist and amateur scientist
- William Waldegrave Palmer, 2nd Earl of Selborne
- John Morley
- Leslie Stephen
- Frederick Pollock
- Francis Aidan Gasquet
- C Barnes Upton
- William Withey Gull
- Robert Clarke
- Arthur Balfour
- James Sully
- Alfred Barratt
