= Lombard Street: A Description of the Money Market =

1873 book on finance by Walter Bagehot

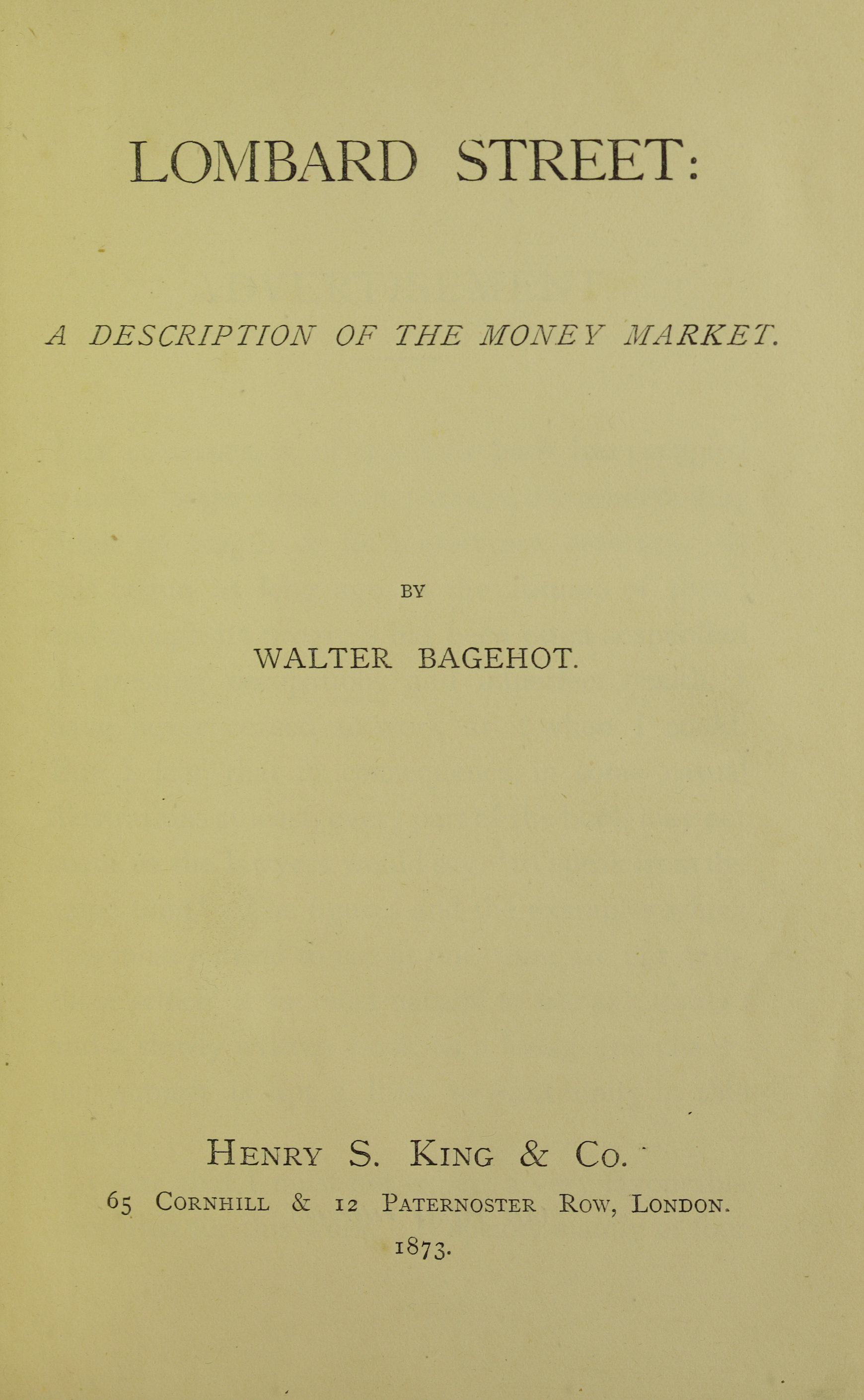
- Hardcover edition
- Author: Walter Bagehot
- Language: English
- Subject: Banking; finance
- Publisher: Henry S. King & Co.
- Publication date: 1873
- Publication place: Great Britain
- Media type: Print (hardback)
- Pages: 359

Lombard Street: A Description of the Money Market (1873) is a book by Walter Bagehot. Bagehot was one of the first writers to describe and explain the world of international and corporate finance, banking, and money in understandable language. The book was initially printed in Great Britain by Henry S. King & Co. in 1873.

== Overview ==
The book was in part a reaction to the financial collapse of Overend, Gurney and Company, a wholesale discount bank located at 65 Lombard Street, London. Lombard Street was a historic center of the London banking industry from medieval times to the 1980s, from which the book draws its title. When Overend, Gurney and Company suspended payments on 10 May 1866, panic spread across London, Liverpool, Manchester, Norwich, Derby and Bristol.

== Lender of last resort ==
Lombard Street is known for its analysis of the Bank of England's response to the Overend-Gurney crisis. Bagehot's advice (sometimes referred to as "Bagehot's dictum") for the lender of last resort during a credit crunch is summarized by Charles Goodhart as follows:

- Lend freely.
- At a high rate of interest.
- On good banking securities.

(Nonetheless, Goodhart emphasizes that many of these ideas were spelled out earlier by Henry Thornton's book The Paper Credit of Great Britain.)

Bagehot's dictum has been summarized by Paul Tucker as follows:

"to avert panic, central banks should lend early and freely (ie without limit), to solvent firms, against good collateral, and at ‘high rates’".

High rates that cause losses to the firm may be too high, say higher than the interest rate the firm or bank is earning from the same asset it is placing as good collateral. Therefore, the highest interest to charge a bank for its good collateral without causing losses to it would be the same prevailing interest rate for said instrument or loan. In 1870 Britain the interest rate paid by the British Government for its annuities was 3.00% therefore a rate of 3.50% would have caused a loss of capital for a bank pledging this instrument as collateral. We also have to consider that a bank has assets higher than its capital so any loss would cause a higher loss of equity for the bank, and it is not in the best interest of the central bank to cause high losses of equity to the firms making up its banking system. Therefore, if the asset has an interest rate of 3.00% a high central bank rate would be 2.50% without causing a leveraged loss of capital to the bank. Take for example the Bank of England's bank rate of 0.10% and the United Kingdom's 10 year Gilt at 0.65% on 14 July 2021.

In Bagehot's own words (Lombard Street, Chapter 7, paragraphs 57–58), lending by the central bank in order to stop a banking panic should follow two rules:

First. That these loans should only be made at a very high rate of interest. This will operate as a heavy fine on unreasonable timidity, and will prevent the greatest number of applications by persons who do not require it. The rate should be raised early in the panic, so that the fine may be paid early; that no one may borrow out of idle precaution without paying well for it; that the Banking reserve may be protected as far as possible.
Secondly. That at this rate these advances should be made on all good banking securities, and as largely as the public ask for them. The reason is plain. The object is to stay alarm, and nothing therefore should be done to cause alarm. But the way to cause alarm is to refuse some one who has good security to offer... No advances indeed need be made by which the Bank will ultimately lose. The amount of bad business in commercial countries is an infinitesimally small fraction of the whole business... The great majority, the majority to be protected, are the 'sound' people, the people who have good security to offer. If it is known that the Bank of England is freely advancing on what in ordinary times is reckoned a good security—on what is then commonly pledged and easily convertible—the alarm of the solvent merchants and bankers will be stayed. But if securities, really good and usually convertible, are refused by the Bank, the alarm will not abate, the other loans made will fail in obtaining their end, and the panic will become worse and worse.

== See also ==
- Money market
- Lender of last resort
- Bank run
