= The Nineteenth Century (periodical) =

British literary magazine

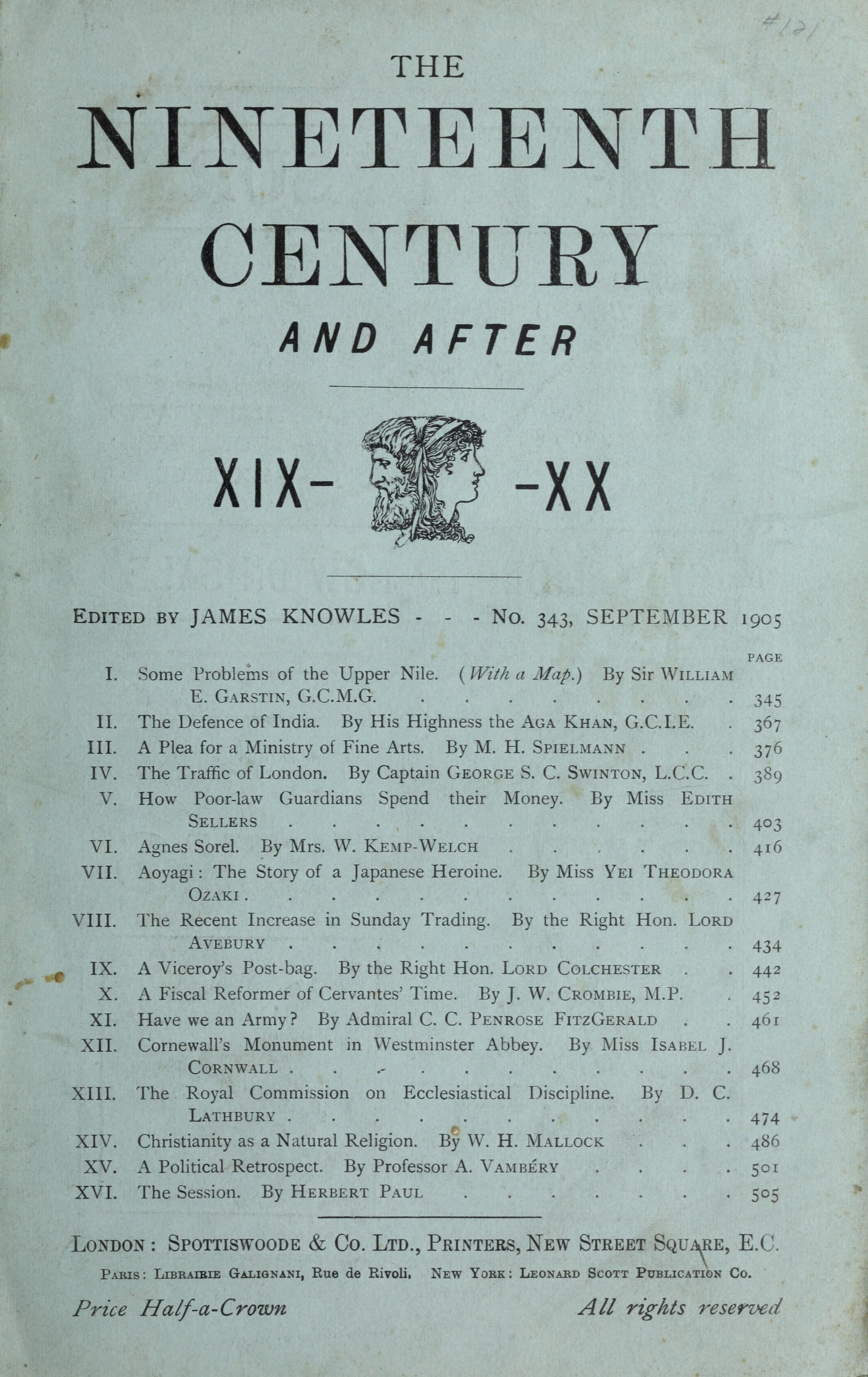
- Front cover of the magazine in September 1905, featuring the Janus symbol adopted after 1901
- Categories: literary magazine
- Founder: James Knowles
- Founded: 1877
- Final issue: 1972; 54 years ago
- Country: United Kingdom

The Nineteenth Century was a British monthly literary magazine founded in 1877 by James Knowles. It is regarded by historians as 'one of the most important and distinguished monthlies of serious thought in the last quarter of the nineteenth century'.

== Editorial policy ==
The magazine was designed as an 'utterly impartial' forum for debate and discussion among leading intellectuals. Many of the early supporters and contributors to The Nineteenth Century were members of the Metaphysical Society, of which Knowles had been secretary. The first issue, for example, contained pieces by former Society members Lord Tennyson, William Gladstone and Cardinal Manning. It quickly became one of the most successful literary magazines in Britain, selling over 20,000 copies a month by early 1878.

An important part of the magazine's success was its regular 'Modern Symposium' section. This offered a series of essays and responses from different authors on subjects such as science or religion, collected together and published as a single structured debate. In this way the magazine quickly gained a reputation as a responsive forum where its contributors were given freedom to disagree without editorial interference. However, the magazine's focus on publishing established literary figures meant that it often excluded younger or unknown writers. Although it generally lived up to its reputation as a 'neutral ground', the magazine did at times abandon impartiality to support positions dear to Knowles himself. For example, it was famously at the forefront of the campaign to prevent the building of a Channel Tunnel between Britain and France in 1882.

== The Nineteenth Century and After ==
In 1901 the title was changed to The Nineteenth Century and After. To emphasise this change, a two-headed Janus-symbol of an old man and a young woman (the former representing the nineteenth century and the latter the twentieth) was added to the cover. Knowles was prevented from simply renaming it The Twentieth Century because the copyright to that name was already owned by someone else, who allegedly demanded a ransom for the rights to use it.

Knowles remained editor until his death, in 1908. During the twentieth century the magazine became politically more right-wing.

The magazine's title was finally changed to The Twentieth Century in 1951. After 1968 its publication cycle was 'irregular'; it ceased publication completely in 1972.

== Editors ==
1877–1908 – James Thomas Knowles
1908–1919 – William Wray Skilbeck
1919–1925 – George A. B. Dewar
1925–1930 – Carrol Romer
1930–1934 – Charles Reginald Schiller Harris
1934–1938 – Arnold Wilson
1938–1946 – Frederick Augustus Voigt
1947–1952 – Michael Goodwin
1952–195? – Bernard Wall

During the magazine's final years it was run 'on a voluntary basis' by an editorial board chaired by Eirene Skilbeck, daughter of William Skilbeck and granddaughter of James Knowles.
