= Meredith Townsend =

Meredith White Townsend (1831–1911) was an English journalist and editor of The Spectator. With Richard Holt Hutton, he was joint-editor of the Spectator until 1887, and he was largely instrumental in making it an established success, writing most of the political articles and the opening paragraphs every week. His two chief publications were The Great Governing Families of England (1865), written in conjunction with Langton Sanford, and Asia and Europe (1901).

Townsend was considered as one of the finest journalists of his day, and he has since been called "the greatest leader writer ever to appear in the English Press."

== Early life ==
Townsend was born at Bures, Suffolk on April 1, 1831. He was educated at Ipswich Grammar School. In 1848, he went out to India, and four years later became editor of the Friend of India, acting also for some years as Times correspondent. In 1860, Townsend returned to England and purchased the weekly Spectator in partnership with Hutton.

== The Spectator ==
Townsend and Hutton remained co-proprietors and joint editors for 25 years, taking a strong stand on some of the most controversial issues of their day. They supported the Federalists against the South in the American Civil War, an unpopular position which, at the time, did some damage to the paper’s circulation, though gained readers in the long run when the North won. They also launched an all-out assault on Benjamin Disraeli, accusing him in a series of leaders of jettisoning ethics for politics by ignoring the atrocities committed against Bulgarian civilians by Turkey in the 1870s.

== Major publications ==
Towsend published Asia and Europe in 1901, the studies presenting the conclusions formed by him in a long life devoted to the subject of the relations between Asia and Europe. He had previously published The Great Governing Families of England (1865) in partnership with John Langton Sanford. The book detailed the histories of the great administrator-families of England. Townsend also contributed to a pseudo-biography of the Arab prophet Mohamed, which was written in a triumphant and imperialistic style.

== Final years ==
In 1887, Townsend was succeeded by John St Loe Strachey, a young aristocrat who had replaced H.H. Asquith (the future Prime Minister) as a leader-writer of the Spectator during the previous year." Towsend died at Little Bookham, Surrey, Oct. 21 1911.
