= Richard Holt Hutton =

English journalist

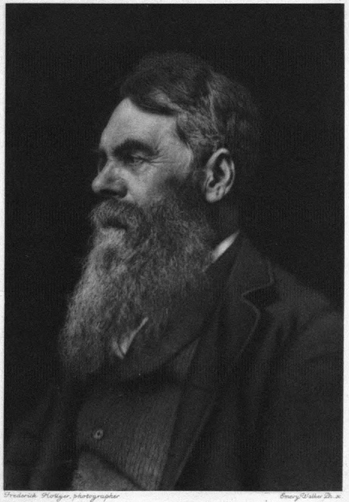
Richard Holt Hutton (1826–1897), by Frederick Hollyer

Richard Holt Hutton (2 June 1826 – 9 September 1897) was an English journalist of literature and religion.

== Life and work ==
The son of Joseph Hutton, a Unitarian minister, Richard Holt Hutton was born at Leeds. His family moved to London in 1835, and he was educated at University College School and University College London, where he began a lifelong friendship with Walter Bagehot, whose works he later edited. He took his degree in 1845, and was awarded the gold medal for philosophy. Meanwhile, he had also studied for short periods at Heidelberg and Berlin, and in 1847 he entered Manchester New College with the idea of becoming a minister like his father, and studied there under James Martineau. He was not, however, called on by any church, and for some time his future was unsettled. In 1851, he married his cousin, Anne Roscoe, and became joint-editor with John Langton Sanford of the Inquirer, the main Unitarian periodical. His innovations and unconventional views about stereotyped Unitarian doctrines caused alarm, and in 1853 he resigned. His health had broken down, and he visited the West Indies, where his wife died of yellow fever.

In 1855 Hutton and Bagehot became joint editors of the National Review, a new monthly which lasted for ten years. During this time Hutton's theological views, influenced directly by Frederick William Robertson and John Frederick Denison Maurice, gradually came closer to those of the Church of England, which he ultimately joined. He brought to his study of theology a spirituality of outlook and an aptitude for metaphysical inquiry and exposition which made his writings more attractive. In 1861 he joined Meredith Townsend as joint editor and part proprietor of the Spectator, then a well-known liberal weekly, but it did not pay. Hutton took charge of the literary side of the paper, and gradually his own articles became one of the best-known features of serious and thoughtful English journalism. The Spectator, which gradually became a prosperous property, was an outlet for his views, particularly on literary, religious and philosophical subjects, in opposition to the agnostic and rationalistic opinions then current in intellectual circles, as popularized by T. H. Huxley.

Hutton had many friends, and became one of the most respected and influential journalists of the day. In 1858 he married Eliza Roscoe, a cousin of his first wife; she died early in 1897, and Hutton's own death followed in the same year.

Among his other publications may be mentioned Essays, Theological and Literary (1871; revised 1888), and Criticisms on Contemporary Thought and Thinkers (1894), and his opinions may be studied compendiously in the selections from his Spectator articles published in 1899 under the title of Aspects of Religious and Scientific Thought.

== Interests ==
He was an original member of the Metaphysical Society (1869). He was an anti-vivisectionist, and a member of the Royal Commission (1875) on that subject, which led to the Cruelty to Animals Act 1876.

Hutton took interest in parapsychology. He was the vice president of the Society for Psychical Research in 1882.

== Collections ==
- 1871. Essays, Theological and Literary. 2 vols. London: Macmillan. (2nd ed., 1880. 3rd ed., 1888. 4th ed., 1895–1896.)
- 1894. Criticisms on Contemporary Thought and Thinkers. 2 vols. London: Macmillan.
- 1899. Aspects of Religious and Scientific Thought. Edited by Elizabeth M. Roscoe. London: Macmillan.
- 1906. Brief Literary Criticisms. Edited by Elizabeth M. Roscoe. London: Macmillan.
- 1989. A Victorian Spectator. Edited by Robert H. Tener and Malcolm Woodfield. Bristol: Bristol Press.
- 1998. A Spectator of Theatre. Edited by Robert H. Tener. Calgary: University of Calgary Press.
