= John Dobree Dalgairns =

English priest (1818–1876)

John Dobree Dalgairns (21 October 1818 – 6 April 1876), English Roman Catholic priest, was born in Guernsey.

== Life ==
Dalgairns attended Elizabeth College, Guernsey. Awarded an Open Scholarship to Exeter College, Oxford, he entered it aged about 17. Under the influence of the Italian missionary Dominic Barberi, he became a Roman Catholic in 1845, and was ordained priest in the following year. He joined his friend John Henry Newman in Rome, and, together with him, entered the Congregation of the Oratory.

On his return to England in 1848, he was attached to the London Oratory, where he laboured successfully as a priest, with the exception of three years spent in Birmingham. Dalgairns was a member of the Metaphysical Society. He died at Burgess Hill, near Brighton, on 6 April 1876.

== Works ==
Soon after taking his degree, Dalgairns contributed a letter to Louis Veuillot's ultramontane organ L'Univers, on "Anglican Church Parties," which made him a reputation. Together with Mark Pattison and others, he translated the Catena aurea of St Thomas Aquinas, a commentary on the Gospels, taken from the works of the Fathers.

He was a contributor to Newman's Lives of the English Saints, for which he wrote the studies on the Cistercian Saints. The Life of St Stephen Harding was translated into several languages.

During the Catholic period of his life, Dalgairns wrote The Devotion to the Sacred Heart of Jesus, with an Introduction on the History of Jansenism (London 1853); The German Mystics of the Fourteenth Century (London, 1858) (See German mysticism); The Holy Communion, its Philosophy, Theology and Practice (Dublin, 1861).

A list of his contributions on religious and philosophical subjects, to the reviews and periodicals, is given in Joseph Gillow's Bibliographical Dictionary of English Catholics, volume ii.
