= Reactions to On the Origin of Species =

Responses to Charles Darwin's 1859 book

The immediate reactions, from November 1859 to April 1861, to On the Origin of Species, the book in which Charles Darwin described evolution by natural selection, included international debate, though the heat of controversy was less than that over earlier works such as Vestiges of Creation. Darwin monitored the debate closely, cheering on Thomas Henry Huxley's battles with Richard Owen to remove clerical domination of the scientific establishment. While Darwin's illness kept him away from the public debates, he read eagerly about them and mustered support through correspondence.

Religious views were mixed, with the Church of England's scientific establishment reacting against the book, while liberal Anglicans strongly supported Darwin's natural selection as an instrument of God's design. Religious controversy was soon diverted by the publication of Essays and Reviews and debate over the higher criticism.

The most famous confrontation took place at the public 1860 Oxford evolution debate during a meeting of the British Association for the Advancement of Science, when the Bishop of Oxford Samuel Wilberforce argued against Darwin's explanation. In the ensuing debate Joseph Hooker argued strongly in favor of Darwinian evolution. Thomas Huxley's support of evolution was so intense that the media and public nicknamed him "Darwin's bulldog". Huxley became the fiercest defender of the evolutionary theory on the Victorian stage. Both sides came away feeling victorious, but Huxley went on to depict the debate as pivotal in a struggle between religion and science and used Darwinism to campaign against the authority of the clergy in education, as well as daringly advocating the "Ape Origin of Man".

== Background ==
Darwin's ideas developed rapidly after returning from the Voyage of the Beagle in 1836. By December 1838, he had developed the basic principles of his theory. At that time, ideas about the transmutation of species were associated with radical political ideas of the Age of Enlightenment and the French Revolution, and some people, such as Darwin's old instructor Robert Edmond Grant had been ridiculed and marginalized by members of the scientific establishment such as Richard Owen for advocating them. Darwin was conscious of the need to answer all likely objections before publishing. While he continued with research, he had an immense amount of work in hand analyzing and publishing findings from the Beagle expedition, and was repeatedly delayed by illness.

The Natural history, especially in Britain, at that time was dominated by proponents of natural theology, who saw their science as revealing God's plan, and many of whom, like Darwin's professors Adam Sedgwick and John Stevens Henslow, were ordained clergy in the Church of England. Darwin found three close allies. The eminent geologist Charles Lyell, whose books had influenced the young Darwin during the Voyage of the Beagle, befriended Darwin who he saw as a supporter of his ideas of gradual geological processes with continuing divine creation of species. By the 1840s Darwin became friends with the young botanist Joseph Dalton Hooker who had followed his father into the science, and after going on a survey voyage used his contacts to eventually find a position. In the 1850s Darwin met Thomas Huxley, an ambitious naturalist who had returned from a long survey trip but lacked the family wealth or contacts to find a career and who joined the progressive group around Herbert Spencer looking to make science a profession, freed from the clerics.

This was also a time of intense conflict over religious morality in England, where evangelicalism led to increasing professionalism of clerics who had previously been expected to act as country gentlemen with wide interests, but now were seriously focussed on expanded religious duties. A new orthodoxy proclaimed the virtues of truth but also inculcated beliefs that the Bible should be read literally and that religious doubt was in itself sinful so should not be discussed. Science was also becoming professional and a series of discoveries cast doubt on literal interpretations of the Bible and the honesty of those denying the findings. A series of crises erupted with fierce debate and criticism over issues such as George Combe's The Constitution of Man and the anonymous Vestiges of the Natural History of Creation which converted vast popular audiences to the belief that natural laws controlled the development of nature and society. German higher criticism questioned the Bible as a historical document in contrast to the evangelical creed that every word was divinely inspired. Dissident clergymen even began questioning accepted premises of Christian morality, and Benjamin Jowett's 1855 commentary on St. Paul brought a storm of controversy.

By September 1854 Darwin's other books reached a stage where he was able to turn his attention fully to Species, and from this point he was working to publish his theory. On 18 June 1858 he received a parcel from Alfred Russel Wallace enclosing about twenty pages describing an evolutionary mechanism that was similar to Darwin's own theory. Darwin put matters in the hands of his friends Lyell and Hooker, who agreed on a joint presentation to the Linnean Society on 1 July 1858. Their papers were entitled, collectively, On the Tendency of Species to form Varieties; and on the Perpetuation of Varieties and Species by Natural Means of Selection.

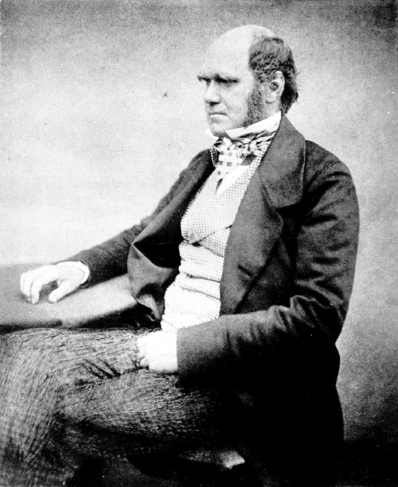
Darwin, as photographed in 1860

=== Publication of The Origin of Species ===
Darwin now worked on an "abstract" trimmed from his Natural Selection manuscript. The publisher John Murray agreed the title as On the Origin of Species through Natural Selection and the book went on sale to the trade on 22 November 1859. The stock of 1,250 copies was oversubscribed, and Darwin, still at Ilkley spa town, began corrections for a second edition. The novelist Charles Kingsley, a Christian socialist country rector, sent him a letter of praise: "It awes me...if you be right I must give up much that I have believed", it was "just as noble a conception of Deity, to believe that He created primal forms capable of self development... as to believe that He required a fresh act of intervention to supply the lacunas which he himself had made." Darwin added these lines to the last chapter, with attribution to "a celebrated author and divine".

== First reviews ==
The reviewers were less encouraging. Four days before publication, a review in the authoritative Athenaeum (by John Leifchild, published anonymously, as was the custom at that time) was quick to pick out the unstated implications of "men from monkeys" already controversial from Vestiges, saw snubs to theologians, summing up Darwin's "creed" as man "was born yesterday – he will perish tomorrow" and concluded that "The work deserves attention, and will, we have no doubt, meet with it. Scientific naturalists will take up the author upon his own peculiar ground; and there will we imagine be a severe struggle for at least theoretical existence. Theologians will say—and they have a right to be heard—Why construct another elaborate theory to exclude Deity from renewed acts of creation? Why not at once admit that new species were introduced by the Creative energy of the Omnipotent? Why not accept direct interference, rather than evolutions of law, and needlessly indirect or remote action? Having introduced the author and his work, we must leave them to the mercies of the Divinity Hall, the College, the Lecture Room, and the Museum." At Ilkley, Darwin raged "But the manner in which he drags in immortality, & sets the Priests at me, & leaves me to their mercies, is base. He would on no account burn me; but he will get the wood ready and tell the black beasts how to catch me." Darwin sprained an ankle and his health worsened, as he wrote to friends it was "odious".

By 9 December when Darwin left Ilkley to come home, he had been told that Murray was organising a second run of 3,000 copies. Hooker had been "converted", Lyell was "absolutely gloating" and Huxley wrote "with such tremendous praise", advising that he was sharpening his "beak and claws" to disembowel "the curs who will bark and yelp".

=== First response ===
Richard Owen had been the first to respond to the complimentary copies, courteously claiming that he had long believed that "existing influences" were responsible for the "ordained" birth of species. Darwin now had long talks with him, and told Lyell that "Under garb of great civility, he was inclined to be most bitter & sneering against me. Yet I infer from several expressions, that at bottom he goes immense way with us." Owen was furious at being included among those defending immutability of species, and in effect said that the book offered the best explanation "ever published of the manner of formation of species", though he did not agree with it in all respects. He still had the gravest doubts that transmutation would bestialise man. It appears that Darwin had assured Owen that he was looking at everything as resulting from designed laws, which Owen interpreted as showing a shared belief in "Creative Power".

Darwin had already made his views clearer to others, telling Lyell that if each step in evolution was providentially planned, the whole procedure would be a miracle and natural selection superfluous. He had also sent a copy to John Herschel, and on 10 December he told Lyell of having "heard by round about channel that Herschel says my Book "is the law of higgledy-piggledy".– What this exactly means I do not know, but it is evidently very contemptuous.– If true this is great blow & discouragement." Darwin subsequently corresponded with Herschel, and in January 1861 Herschel added a footnote to the draft of his Physical Geography which, while disparaging "the principle of arbitrary and casual variation and natural selection" as insufficient without "intelligent direction", said that "with some demur as to the genesis of man, we are far from disposed to repudiate the view taken of this mysterious subject in Mr. Darwin's book."

=== Geological time ===
It was known that the geologic time scale was "incomprehensibly vast", if unquantifiable. From 1848 Darwin discussed data with Andrew Ramsay, who had said "it is vain to attempt to measure the duration of even small portions of geological epochs." A chapter of Lyell's Principles of Geology described the enormous amount of erosion involved in forming the Weald. To demonstrate the time available for natural selection to operate, Darwin drew on Lyell's example and Ramsay's data in chapter 9 of On the Origin of Species to estimate that erosion of the Weald's layered dome of Lower Cretaceous rocks "must have required 306,662,400 years; or say three hundred million years."

The "necessary corrections" Darwin made to his drafts for the second edition of the Origin were based on comments from others, particularly Lyell, and added a caveat suggesting a faster rate of erosion of the Weald: "perhaps it would be safer to allow two or three inches per century, and this would reduce the number of years to one hundred and fifty or one hundred million years." Copies of the second edition were advertised as ready on 24 December, in advance of official publication on 7 January 1860.

The Saturday Review of 24 December 1859 strongly criticised the methodology of Darwin's calculations. On 3 January 1860, Darwin wrote to Hooker about it: "Some of the remarks about the lapse of years are very good, & the Reviewer gives me some good & well deserved raps,—confound it I am sorry to confess the truth. But it does not at all concern main argument." A day later, he said to Lyell "You saw I suppose Saturday Review: argument confined to Geology, but has given me some perfectly just & severe raps on knuckles."

In the third edition published on 30 April 1861, Darwin cited the Saturday Review article as reason to remove his calculation altogether.

=== Friendly reviews ===
The December 1859 review in the British Unitarian National Review was written by Darwin's old friend William Carpenter, who was clear that only a world of "order, continuity, and progress" befitted an Omnipotent Deity and that "any theological objection" to a species of slug or a breed of dog deriving from a previous one was "simply absurd" dogma. He touched on human evolution, satisfied that the struggle for existence tended "inevitably... towards the progressive exaltation of the races engaged in it".

On Boxing Day (26 December) The Times carried an anonymous review. The staff reviewer, "as innocent of any knowledge of science as a babe", gave the task to Huxley, leading Darwin to ask his friend how "did you influence Jupiter Olympus and make him give three and a half columns to pure science? The old fogies will think the world will come to an end." Darwin treasured the piece more than "a dozen reviews in common periodicals", but noted "Upon my life I am sorry for Owen... he will be so d—d savage, for credit given to any other man, I strongly suspect, is in his eyes so much credit robbed from him. Science is so narrow a field, it is clear there ought to be only one cock of the walk!".

Hooker also wrote a favourable review, which appeared at the end of December in the Gardener's Chronicle and treated the theory as an extension of horticultural lore.

=== Clerical concern, atheist enthusiasm ===
In his lofty position at the head of Natural History Collections at the British Museum, Owen received numerous complaints about the book. The Revd. Adam Sedgwick, geologist at the University of Cambridge who had taken Darwin on his first geology field trip, could not see the point in a world without providence. The missionary David Livingstone could see no struggle for existence on the African plains. Jeffries Wyman at Harvard saw no truth in chance variations.

The most enthusiastic response came from atheists, with Hewett Watson hailing Darwin as the "greatest revolutionist in natural history of this century". The 68-year-old Robert Edmund Grant, who had shown him the study of invertebrates when Darwin was a student at the University of Edinburgh and who was still teaching Lamarckian evolution weekly at University College London, brought out a small book on classification dedicated to Darwin: "With one fell-sweep of the wand of truth, you have now scattered to the winds the pestilential vapours accumulated by 'species-mongers'."

== Widespread interest ==
In January 1860, Darwin told Lyell of a reported incident at Waterloo Bridge Station: "I never till to day realised that it was getting widely distributed; for in a letter from a lady today to Emma, she says she heard a man enquiring for it at Railway Station!!! at Waterloo Bridge; & the Bookseller said that he had none till new Edit. was out.— The Bookseller said he had not read it but had heard it was a very remarkable book!!!"

=== Asa Gray in the United States ===
In December 1859 the botanist Asa Gray negotiated with a Boston publisher for publication of an authorised American version, however, he learnt that two New York publishing firms were already planning to exploit the absence of international copyright to print Origin. Darwin wrote in January, "I never dreamed of my Book being so successful with general readers: I believe I should have laughed at the idea of sending the sheets to America." and asked Gray to keep any profits. Gray managed to negotiate a 5 per cent royalty with Appleton's of New York, who got their edition out in mid January, and the other two withdrew. In a May letter Darwin mentioned a print run of 2,500 copies, but it is not clear if this was the first printing alone as there were four that year.

When sending his Historical preface and corrections for the American edition in February, Darwin thanked Asa Gray for his comments, as "a Review from a man, who is not an entire convert, if fair & moderately favourable, is in all respects the best kind of Review. About weak points I agree. The eye to this day gives me a cold shudder, but when I think of the fine known gradations, my reason tells me I ought to conquer the cold shudder." In April he continued, "It is curious that I remember well time when the thought of the eye made me cold all over, but I have got over this stage of the complaint, & now small trifling particulars of structure often make me very uncomfortable. The sight of a feather in a peacock's tail, whenever I gaze at it, makes me sick!" A month later Darwin emphasised that he was bewildered by the theological aspects and "had no intention to write atheistically, but could not see, as plainly as others do, & as I sh^{d} wish to do, evidence of design & beneficence on all sides of us. There seems to me too much misery in the world. I cannot persuade myself that a beneficent and omnipotent God would have designedly created the Ichneumonidae with the express intention of their feeding within the living bodies of caterpillars" – expressing his particular revulsion at the Ichneumonidae family of parasitic wasps that lay their eggs in the larvae and pupae of other insects so that their parasitoid young have a ready source of food. He therefore could not believe in the necessity of design, but rather than attributing the wonders of the universe to brute force was "inclined to look at everything as resulting from designed laws, with the details, whether good or bad, left to the working out of what we may call chance. Not that this notion at all satisfies me. I feel most deeply that the whole subject is too profound for the human intellect. A dog might as well speculate on the mind of Newton" – referring to Isaac Newton.

=== Erasmus and Martineau ===
Darwin's brother Erasmus reported on 23 November that their cousin Henry Holland was reading the book and in "a dreadful state of indecision", sure that explaining the eye would be "utterly impossible", but after reading it "he hummed & hawed & perhaps it was partly conceivable". Erasmus himself thought it "the most interesting book I ever read", and sent a copy to his old flame Miss Harriet Martineau who, at 58, was still reviewing from her home in the Lake District. Martineau sent her thanks, adding that she had previously praised "the quality & conduct of your brother's mind, but it is an unspeakable satisfaction to see here the full manifestation of its earnestness & simplicity, its sagacity, its industry, & the patient power by w^{h}. it has collected such a mass of facts, to transmute them by such sagacious treatment into such portentious knowledge. I sh^{d}. much like to know how large a proportion of our scientific men believe he has found a sound road."

Writing to her fellow Malthusian (and atheist) George Holyoake she enthused, "What a book it is! – overthrowing (if true) revealed Religion on the one hand, & Natural (as far as Final Causes & Design are concerned) on the other. The range & mass of knowledge take away one's breath." To Fanny Wedgwood she wrote, "I rather regret that C.D. went out of his way two or three times to speak of "The Creator" in the popular sense of the First Cause.... His subject is the 'Origin of Species' & not the origin of Organisation; & it seems a needless mischief to have opened the latter speculation at all – There now! I have delivered my mind."

=== Clerical reaction ===
The Revd. Adam Sedgwick had received his copy "with more pain than pleasure." Without Creation showing divine love, "humanity, to my mind, would suffer a damage that might brutalise it, and sink the human race..." He indicated that unless Darwin accepted God's revelation in nature and scripture, Sedgwick would not meet Darwin in heaven, a sentiment that upset Emma. The Revd. John Stevens Henslow, the botany professor whose natural history course Charles had joined thirty years earlier, gave faint praise to the Origin as "a stumble in the right direction" but distanced himself from its conclusions, "a question past our finding out..."

The Anglican establishment predominantly opposed Darwin. Palmerston, who became Prime Minister in June 1859, mooted Darwin's name to Queen Victoria as a candidate for the Honours List with the prospect of a knighthood. While Prince Albert supported the idea, after the publication of the Origin Queen Victoria's ecclesiastical advisers, including the Bishop of Oxford Samuel Wilberforce, dissented and the request was denied. Some Anglicans were more in favour, and Huxley reported of Kingsley that "He is an excellent Darwinian to begin with, and told me a capital story of his reply to Lady Aylesbury who expressed astonishment at his favouring such a heresy – 'What can be more delightful to me Lady Aylesbury, than to know that your Ladyship & myself sprang from the same toad stool.' Whereby the frivolous old woman shut up, in doubt whether she was being chaffed or adored for her remark."

There was no official comment from the Vatican for several decades, but in 1860 a council of the German Catholic bishops pronounced that the belief that "man as regards his body, emerged finally from the spontaneous continuous change of imperfect nature to the more perfect, is clearly opposed to Sacred Scripture and to the Faith." This defined the range of official Catholic discussion of evolution, which has remained almost exclusively concerned with human evolution.

=== Huxley and Owen ===
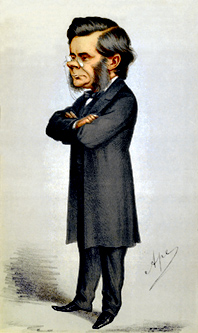
The combative Thomas Huxley demanded a fair hearing for Darwin's ideas.

On 10 February 1860 Huxley gave a lecture titled On Species and Races, and their Origin at the Royal Institution, reviewing Darwin's theory with fancy pigeons on hand to demonstrate artificial selection, as well as using the occasion to confront the clergy with his aim of wresting science from ecclesiastical control. He referred to Galileo's persecution by the church, "the little Canutes of the hour enthroned in solemn state, bidding that great wave to stay, and threatening to check its beneficent progress." He hailed the Origin as heralding a "new Reformation" in a battle against "those who would silence and crush" science, and called on the public to cherish Science and "follow her methods faithfully and implicitly in their application to all branches of human thought," for the future of England. To Darwin such rhetoric was "time wasted" and on reflection he thought the lecture "an entire failure which gave no just idea of natural selection," but by March he was listing those on "our side" as against the "outsiders." His close allies were Hooker and Huxley, and in August he called Huxley his "good and kind agent for the propagation of the Gospel – i.e. the devil's gospel."

The position of Richard Owen was unknown: when emphasising to a Parliamentary committee the need for a new Natural History museum, he pointed out that "The whole intellectual world this year has been excited by a book on the origin of species; and what is the consequence? Visitors come to the British Museum, and they say, 'Let us see all these varieties of pigeons: where is the tumbler, where is the pouter?' and I am obliged with shame to say, I can show you none of them..." As to showing you the varieties of those species, or of any of those phenomena that would aid one in getting at that mystery of mysteries, the origin of species, our space does not permit; but surely there ought to be a space somewhere, and, if not in the British Museum, where is it to be obtained?"

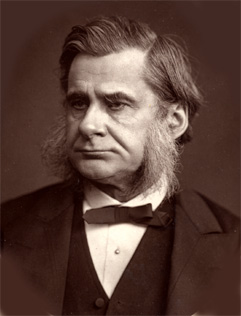
Thomas Henry Huxley applied Darwins ideas to humans. This showed humans and apes had a common ancestor.

Huxley's April review in the Westminster Review included the first mention of the term "Darwinism" in the question, "What if the orbit of Darwinism should be a little too circular?" Darwin thought it a "brilliant review."

Overflowing the narrow bounds of purely scientific circles, the "species question" divides with Italy and the Volunteers the attention of general society. Everybody has read Mr. Darwin's book, or, at least, has given an opinion upon its merits or demerits; pietists, whether lay or ecclesiastic, decry it with the mild railing which sounds so charitable; bigots denounce it with ignorant invective; old ladies of both sexes consider it a decidedly dangerous book, and even savants, who have no better mud to throw, quote antiquated writers to show that its author is no better than an ape himself; while every philosophical thinker hails it as a veritable Whitworth gun in the armoury of liberalism; and all competent naturalists and physiologists, whatever their opinions as to the ultimate fate of the doctrines put forth, acknowledge that the work in which they are embodied is a solid contribution to knowledge and inaugurates a new epoch in natural history. – Thomas Huxley, 1860

When Owen's own anonymous review of the Origin appeared in the April Edinburgh Review he praised himself and his own axiom of the continuous operation of the ordained becoming of living things, and showed his anger at what he saw as Darwin's caricature of the creationist position and ignoring Owen's pre-eminence. To him, new species appeared at birth, not through natural selection. As well as attacking Darwin's "disciples" Hooker and Huxley, he thought that the book symbolised the sort of "abuse of science to which a neighbouring nation, some seventy years since, owed its temporary degradation." Darwin had Huxley and Hooker staying with him when he read it, and he wrote telling Lyell that it was "extremely malignant, clever & I fear will be very damaging. He is atrociously severe on Huxley's lecture, & very bitter against Hooker. So we three enjoyed it together: not that I really enjoyed it, for it made me uncomfortable for one night; but I have got quite over it today. It requires much study to appreciate all the bitter spite of many of the remarks against me; indeed I did not discover all myself.– It scandalously misrepresents many parts. .... It is painful to be hated in the intense degree with which Owen hates me." He commented to Henslow that "Owen is indeed very spiteful. He misrepresents & alters what I say very unfairly. .... The Londoners says he is mad with envy because my book has been talked about: what a strange man to be envious of a naturalist like myself, immeasurably his inferior!"

=== Geological time and Phillips ===
Darwin's had estimated that erosion of the Weald would take 300 million years, but in the second edition of On the Origin of Species published on 7 January 1860 he accepted that it would be safer to allow 150 million to 200 million years.

Geologists knew the earth was ancient, but had felt unable to put realistic figures on the duration of past geological changes. Darwin's book provided a new impetus to quantifying geological time. His most prominent critic, John Phillips, had investigated how temperatures increased with depth in the 1830s, and was convinced that, contrary to Lyell and Darwin's uniformitarianism, the Earth was cooling over the long term. Between 1838 and 1855 he tried various ways of quantifying the timing of stratified deposits, without success. On 17 February 1860, Phillips used his presidential address to the Geological Society of London to accuse Darwin of "abuse of arithmetic". He said 300 million years was an "inconceivable number" and that, depending on assumptions, erosion of the Weald could have taken anything from 12,000 years to at most 1,332,000 years, well below Darwin's estimate. When giving the May 1860 Rede Lecture, Phillips produced his own first published estimates of the duration of the whole stratigraphic record, using rates of sedimentation to calculate it at around 96 million years.

=== Natural persecution ===
Most reviewers wrote with great respect, deferring to Darwin's eminent position in science though finding it hard to understand how natural selection could work without a divine selector. There were hostile comments, at the start of May he commented to Lyell that he had "received in a Manchester Newspaper a rather a good squib, showing that I have proved 'might is right', & therefore that Napoleon is right & every cheating Tradesman is also right". The Saturday Review reported that "The controversy excited by the appearance of Darwin's remarkable work on the Origin of Species has passed beyond the bounds of the study and lecture-room into the drawing-room and the public street."

The older generation of Darwin's tutors were rather negative, and later in May he told his cousin Fox that "the attacks have been falling thick & heavy on my now case-hardened hide.— Sedgwick & Clarke opened regular battery on me lately at Cambridge Phil. Soc^{y}. & dear old Henslow defended me in grand style, saying that my investigations were perfectly legitimate." While defending Darwin's honest motives and belief that "he was exalting & not debasing our views of a Creator, in attributing to him a power of imposing laws on the Organic World by which to do his work, as effectually as his laws imposed upon the inorganic had done it in the Mineral Kingdom", Henslow had not disguised his own opinion that "Darwin has pressed his hypothesis too far".

In June, Karl Marx saw the book as a "bitter satire" that showed "a basis in natural science for class struggle in history", in which "Darwin recognizes among beasts and plants his English society".

Darwin remarked to Lyell, "I must be a very bad explainer... Several Reviews, & several letters have shown me too clearly how little I am understood. I suppose natural selection was bad term; but to change it now, I think, would make confusion worse confounded. Nor can I think of better; Natural preservation would not imply a preservation of particular varieties & would seem a truism; & would not bring man's & nature's selection under one point of view. I can only hope by reiterated explanations finally to make matter clearer." It was too illegible for Lyell, and Darwin later apologised "I am utterly ashamed & groan over my hand-writing. It was Natural Preservation. Natural persecution is what the author ought to suffer."

== Debate ==
=== Essays and Reviews ===
Around February 1860 liberal theologians entered the fray, when seven produced a manifesto titled Essays and Reviews. These Anglicans included Oxford professors, country clergymen, the headmaster of Rugby school and a layman. Their declaration that miracles were irrational stirred up unprecedented anger, drawing much of the fire away from Darwin. Essays sold 22,000 copies in two years, more than the Origin sold in twenty years, and sparked five years of increasingly polarised debate with books and pamphlets furiously contesting the issues.

The most scientific of the seven was the Reverend Baden Powell, who held the Savilian chair of geometry at the University of Oxford. Referring to "Mr Darwin's masterly volume" and restating his argument that God is a lawgiver, miracles break the lawful edicts issued at Creation, therefore belief in miracles is atheistic, he wrote that the book "must soon bring about an entire revolution in opinion in favour of the grand principle of the self-evolving powers of nature." He drew attacks, with Sedgwick accusing him of "greedily" adopting nonsense and Tory reviews saying he was joining "the infidel party". He would have been on the platform at the British Association debate, facing the bishop, but died of a heart attack on 11 June.

=== The British Association debate ===
The most famous confrontation took place at a meeting of the British Association for the Advancement of Science in Oxford on Saturday 30 June 1860. While there was no formal debate organised on the issue, Professor John William Draper of New York University was to talk on Darwin and social progress at a routine "Botany and Zoology" meeting. The new museum hall was crowded with clergy, undergraduates, Oxford dons and gentlewomen anticipating that Samuel Wilberforce, the Bishop of Oxford, would speak to repeat the savage trouncing he had given in 1847 to the Vestiges published anonymously by Robert Chambers. Owen lodged with Wilberforce the night before, but Wilberforce would have been well prepared as he had just reviewed the Origin for the Tory Quarterly for a fee of £60. Huxley was not going to wait for the meeting, but met Chambers who accused him of "deserting them" and changed his mind. Darwin was taking treatment at Dr. Lane's new hydropathic establishment at Sudbrooke Park, Petersham, near Richmond in Surrey.

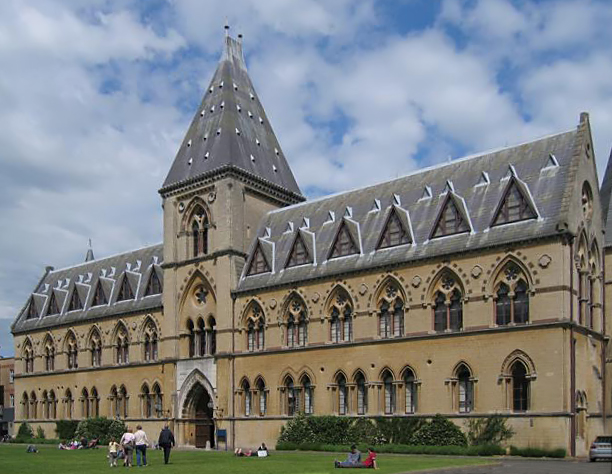
The debate was held in the Oxford University Museum of Natural History.

From Hooker's account, Draper "droned on for an hour", then for half an hour "Soapy Sam" Wilberforce replied with the eloquence that had earned him his nickname. This time the climate of opinion had changed and the ensuing debate was more evenly matched, with Hooker being particularly successful in defence of Darwin's ideas. In response to what Huxley took as a jibe from Wilberforce as to whether it was on Huxley's grandfather's or grandmother's side that he was descended from an ape, Huxley made a reply which he later recalled as being that "[if asked] would I rather have a miserable ape for a grandfather or a man highly endowed by nature and possessed of great means and influence and yet who employs these faculties and that influence for the mere purpose of introducing ridicule into a grave scientific discussion I unhesitatingly affirm my preference for the ape". No verbatim record was taken: eyewitness accounts exist, and vary somewhat.

Robert FitzRoy, who had been the captain of HMS Beagle during Darwin's voyage, was there to present a paper on storms. During the debate FitzRoy, seen by Hooker as "a grey haired Roman nosed elderly gentleman", stood in the centre of the audience and "lifting an immense Bible first with both and afterwards with one hand over his head, solemnly implored the audience to believe God rather than man". As he admitted that the Origin of Species had given him "acutest pain" the crowd shouted him down.

Hooker's "blood boiled, I felt myself a dastard; now I saw my advantage–I swore to myself I would smite that Amalekite Sam hip and thigh", (he was invited up to the platform and) "there and then I smacked him amid rounds of applause... proceeded to demonstrate... that he could never have read your book... wound up with a very few observations on the...old and new hypotheses... Sam was shut up... and the meeting was dissolved forthwith leaving you [Darwin] master of the field after 4 hours battle."

Both sides came away claiming victory, with Hooker and Huxley each sending Darwin rather contradictory triumphant accounts. Supporters of Darwinism seized on this meeting as a sign that the idea of evolution could not be suppressed by authority, and would be defended vigorously by its advocates. Liberal clerics were also satisfied that literal belief in all aspects of the Bible was now questioned by science; they were sympathetic to some of the ideas in Essays and Reviews. William Whewell wrote to his friend James David Forbes that "Perhaps the Bishop was not prudent to venture into a field where no eloquence can supersede the need for precise knowledge. The young naturalists declared themselves in favour of Darwin’s views which tendency I saw already at Leeds two years ago. I am sorry for it, for I reckon Darwin’s book to be an utterly unphilosophical one."

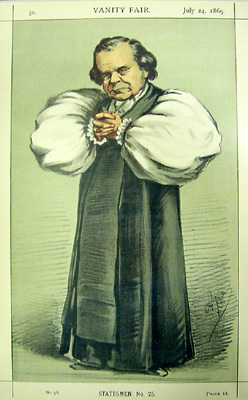
1869 Caricature of Wilberforce. His hand washing gesture helped earn the Bishop of Oxford his nickname.

=== Wilberforce's Quarterly review ===
In late July Darwin read Wilberforce's review in the Quarterly. It used a 60-year-old parody from the Anti-Jacobin of the prose of Darwin's grandfather Erasmus, implying old revolutionary sympathies. It argued that if "transmutations were actually occurring" this would be seen in rapidly reproducing invertebrates, and since it isn't, why think that "the favourite varieties of turnips are tending to become men". Darwin pencilled "rubbish" in the margin. To the statement about classification that "all creation is the transcript in matter of ideas eternally existing in the mind of the Most High!!", Darwin scribbled "mere words". At the same time, Darwin was willing to grant that Wilberforce's review was clever: he wrote to Hooker that "it picks out with skill all the most conjectural parts, and brings forward well all the difficulties. It quizzes me quite splendidly by quoting the 'Anti-Jacobin' against my Grandfather."

Wilberforce also attacked Essays and Reviews in the Quarterly Review, and in a letter to The Times, signed by the Archbishop of Canterbury and 25 bishops, which threatened the theologians with the ecclesiastical courts. Darwin quoted a proverb: "A bench of bishops is the devil's flower garden", and joined others including Lyell, though not Hooker and Huxley, in signing a counter-letter supporting Essays and Reviews for trying to "establish religious teachings on a firmer and broader foundation". Despite this alignment of pro-evolution scientists and Unitarians with liberal churchmen, two of the authors were indicted for heresy and lost their jobs by 1862.

=== Geological time, Phillips and third edition ===
In October 1860, John Phillips published Life on the Earth, its origin and succession, reiterating points from his Rede Lecture and disputing Darwin's arguments. He sent a copy to Darwin, who thanked him, though "sorry, but not surprised, to see that you are dead against me".

On 20 November, Darwin told Lyell of his revisions for a third edition of the Origin, including removing his estimate of the time it took for the Weald to erode: "The confounded Wealden calculation, to be struck out. & a note to be inserted to effect that I am convinced of its inaccuracy from Review in Saturday R. & from Phillips, as I see in Table of Contents that he attacks it." He later told Lyell that "Having burnt my own fingers so consumedly with the Wealden, I am fearful for you", and advised caution: "for Heaven-sake take care of your fingers; to burn them severely, as I have done, is very unpleasant." The third edition, as published on 30 April 1861, stated "The computation of time required for the denudation of the Weald omitted. I have been convinced of its inaccuracy in several respects by an excellent article in the 'Saturday Review,' Dec. 24, 1859."

=== Natural History Review ===
The Natural History Review was bought and refurbished by Huxley, Lubbock, Busk and other "plastically minded young men" – supporters of Darwin. The first issue in January 1861 carried Huxley's paper on man's relationship to apes, "showing up" Owen. Huxley cheekily sent a copy to Wilberforce.

== Darwin at home ==
As the battles raged, Darwin returned home from the spa to proceed with experiments on chloroforming carnivorous sundew plants, looking over his Natural Selection manuscript and drafting two chapters on pigeon breeding that would eventually form part of The Variation of Animals and Plants Under Domestication. He wrote to Asa Gray and used the example of fantail pigeons to argue against Gray's belief "that variation has been led along certain beneficial lines", with the implication of Creationism rather than Natural Selection.

Over the winter he organised a third edition of the Origin, adding an introductory historical sketch. Asa Gray had published three supportive articles in the Atlantic Monthly. Darwin persuaded Gray to publish them as a pamphlet, and was delighted when Gray came up with the title of Natural Selection Not Inconsistent with Natural Theology. Darwin paid half the cost, imported 250 copies into Britain and as well as advertising it in periodicals and sending 100 copies out to scientists, reviewers, and theologians (including Wilberforce), he included in the Origin a recommendation for it, available to be purchased for 1s. 6d. from Trübner's in Paternoster Row.

The Huxleys became close family friends, frequently visiting Down House. When their 3-year-old son died of scarlet fever they were badly affected. Henrietta Huxley brought their three infants to Down in March 1861 where Emma helped to console her, while Huxley continued with his working-men's lectures at the Royal School of Mines, writing that "My working men stick with me wonderfully, the house fuller than ever, By next Friday evening they will all be convinced that they are monkeys."

=== Arguments with Owen ===
Huxley's arguments with Owen continued in the Athenaeum so that each Saturday Darwin could read the latest ripostes. Owen tried to smear Huxley by portraying him as an "advocate of man's origins from a transmuted ape", and one of his contributions was titled "Ape-Origin of Man as Tested by the Brain". This backfired, as Huxley had already delighted Darwin by speculating on "pithecoid man" – ape-like man, and was glad of the invitation to publicly turn the anatomy of brain structure into a question of human ancestry. He was determined to indict Owen for perjury, promising "before I have done with that mendacious humbug I will nail him out, like a kite to a barn door, an example to all evil doers." Darwin egged him on from Down, writing "Oh Lord what a thorn you must be in the poor dear man's side".

Their campaign ran over two years and was devastatingly successful, with each "slaying" being followed by a recruiting drive for the Darwinian cause. The spite lingered. When Huxley joined the Zoological Society Council in 1861, Owen left, and in the following year Huxley moved to stop Owen from being elected to the Royal Society Council as "no body of gentlemen" should admit a member "guilty of wilful & deliberate falsehood."

Lyell was troubled both by Huxley's belligerence and by the question of ape ancestry, but got little sympathy from Darwin who teased him that "Our ancestor was an animal which breathed water, had a swim bladder, a great swimming tail, an imperfect skull, and undoubtedly was a hermaphrodite! Here is a pleasant genealogy for mankind." Lyell began work on a book examining human origins.

=== Geological time: William Thomson (Lord Kelvin) ===
Like the geologist John Phillips, the physicist William Thomson (later ennobled as Baron Kelvin of Largs, thus becoming Lord Kelvin) had considered since the 1840s that the physics of thermodynamics required that the Earth was cooling from an initial molten state. This contradicted Lyell's uniformitarian concept of unchanging processes over deep geological time, which Darwin shared and had assumed would allow ample time for the slow process of natural selection.

In June 1861 Thomson asked Phillips how geologists felt about Darwin's "prodigious durations for geological epochs". and mentioned his own preliminary calculation that the Sun was 20 million years old, with the Earth at most 200 to 1,000 million years old. Phillips discussed his own published view that stratified rocks went back 96 million years, and dismissed Darwin's original estimate that the Weald had taken 300 million years to erode. In September 1861 Thomson produced a paper "On the age of the Sun's heat" which estimated that the Sun was between 100 and 500 million years old, and in 1862 he used assumptions on the rate of cooling from a molten condition to estimate the age of the Earth at 98 million years. The dispute continued for the rest of Darwin's life.

== Continued debate ==
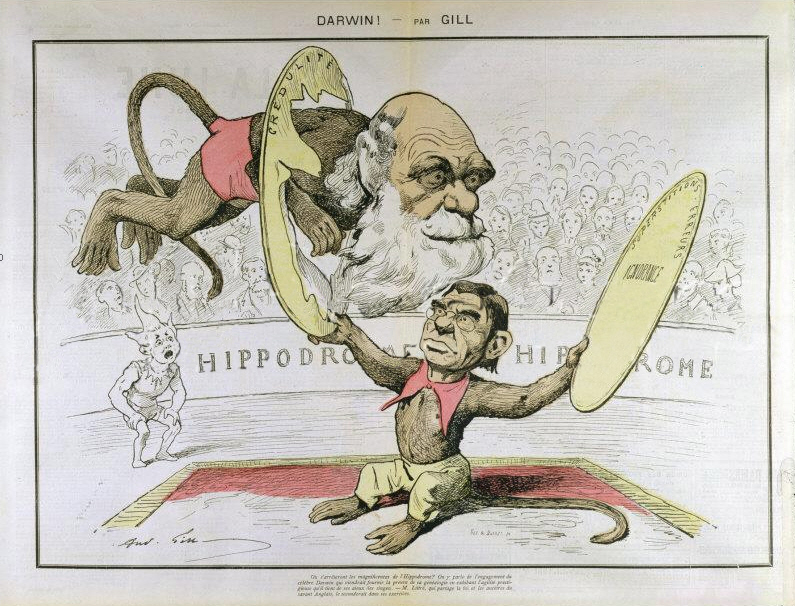
A French caricature around 1878 shows a bearded Darwin breaking through hoops of "gullibility, superstitions, errors, and ignorance" held up by Émile Littré.

The reception of Darwin's ideas continued to arouse scientific and religious debates, and wide public interest. Satirical cartoonists seized on animal ancestry in relation to other topical issues, drawing on a long tradition of identifying animal traits in humans. In Britain mass circulation magazines were droll rather than cruel, and thus presented Darwin's theory in an unthreatening way. Due to illness, Darwin began growing a beard in 1862, and when he reappeared in public in 1866 with a bushy beard, caricatures centred on Darwin and his new look contributed to a trend in which all forms of evolutionism were identified with Darwinism.

== See also ==
- Darwin from Orchids to Variation, Darwin's life, work and influences in the following period.

== Bibliography ==
- Altholz, Josef L. (1976), "The warfare of conscience with theology", in Altholz, Josef L. (ed.), The Mind and Art of Victorian England, University of Minnesota Press, pp. 58–77, ISBN 0-8166-5693-2
- Bowler, Peter J. (2003), Evolution: The History of an Idea (3rd ed.), University of California Press, ISBN 0-520-23693-9
- Browne, E. Janet (2002), Charles Darwin: vol. 2 The Power of Place, London: Jonathan Cape, ISBN 0-7126-6837-3
- Burchfield, Joe D. (1974). "Darwin and the Dilemma of Geological Time". Isis. 65 (3). University of Chicago Press: 301–321. Bibcode:1974Isis...65..301B. doi:10.1086/351300. S2CID 55390686. pdf
- Carpenter, William Benjamin (December 1859), "Darwin on the Origin of Species", National Review, vol. 10, pp. 188–214. Published anonymously.
- Darwin, Charles; Costa, James T. (2009). The Annotated Origin: A Facsimile of the First Edition of On the Origin of Species. Harvard University Press. ISBN 978-0-674-03281-1.
- Darwin, Charles (1859), "On the Origin of Species by Means of Natural Selection, or the Preservation of Favoured Races in the Struggle for Life", Nature, 5 (121) (1st ed.), London: John Murray: 318–319, Bibcode:1872Natur...5..318B, doi:10.1038/005318a0, PMC 5184128, PMID 30164232
- Darwin, Charles (1860), "On the Origin of Species by Means of Natural Selection, or the Preservation of Favoured Races in the Struggle for Life", Nature, 5 (121) (2nd ed.), London: John Murray: 318–319, Bibcode:1872Natur...5..318B, doi:10.1038/005318a0, PMC 5184128, PMID 30164232
- Darwin, Charles (1861), "On the Origin of Species by Means of Natural Selection, or the Preservation of Favoured Races in the Struggle for Life", Nature, 5 (121) (3rd ed.), London: John Murray: 318–319, Bibcode:1872Natur...5..318B, doi:10.1038/005318a0, PMC 5184128, PMID 30164232
- Darwin, Francis (1887), The Life and Letters of Charles Darwin, including an autobiographical chapter (3 Volumes), London: John Murray
- Darwin, Francis; Seward, A. C (1903), More letters of Charles Darwin (2 Volumes), London: John Murray
- Desmond, Adrian; Moore, James (1991), Darwin, London: Michael Joseph, Penguin Group, ISBN 0-7181-3430-3
- Freeman, R.B. (2007), Charles Darwin: A companion (2d online edition, compiled by Sue Asscher and edited by John van Wyhe ed.), The Complete Works of Charles Darwin Online
- Freeman, Richard B. (1977a), "On the Origin of Species", The Works of Charles Darwin: An Annotated Bibliographical Handlist (2nd ed.), Folkestone, England: Dawson, ISBN 0-7129-0740-8
- Henslow, John Stevens (1861), "Letter from Professor Henslow", Macmillan's Magazine, 3: 336. Letter dated January 1861.
- Herbert, Sandra (January 2005). Charles Darwin, Geologist. Cornell University Press. ISBN 0-8014-4348-2.
- Hooker, Joseph D. (31 December 1859), "(Review of) On the origin of species", The Gardeners' Chronicle (1052)
- Huxley, Leonard (1903), Life and letters of Thomas Henry Huxley (2 Volumes) (2nd ed.), London: Macmillan. The first edition was published in 1900.
- Huxley, Thomas H. (26 December 1859), "Darwin on the Origin of Species", The Times: 8–9. Published anonymously.
- Huxley, Thomas H. (April 1860), "Darwin on the Origin of Species", Westminster Review, 17: 541–570. Published anonymously.
- Larson, Edward J. (2004), Evolution: The Remarkable History of a Scientific Theory, New York: Modern Library, ISBN 0-8129-6849-2
- Leifchild, John R. (19 November 1859), "Literature", Athenaeum, no. 1673
- Lucas, J. R. (1979), "Wilberforce and Huxley: A Legendary Encounter", The Historical Journal, vol. 22, no. 2, pp. 313–330, doi:10.1017/S0018246X00016848, PMID 11617072, archived from the original on 27 June 2020
- Morrell, Jack (2001), "Genesis and geochronology: the case of John Phillips (1800–1874)", Geological Society, London, Special Publications, 190 (1), Geological Society of London: 85–90, Bibcode:2001GSLSP.190...85M, CiteSeerX 10.1.1.973.6253, doi:10.1144/gsl.sp.2001.190.01.07, S2CID 129792582
- Owen, Richard (1860), "Review of Darwin's Origin of Species", Edinburgh Review, 3 (April 1860): 487–532. Published anonymously.
- Wilberforce, Samuel (July 1860), "(Review of) On the Origin of Species", Quarterly Review, 108 (215): 225–264. Published anonymously.
- Wilberforce, Samuel (1861), "(Review of) Essays and Reviews", Quarterly Review, 109: 248–301. Published anonymously.
- Wollaston, A.F.R. (1921), Life of Alfred Newton: late Professor of Comparative Anatomy, Cambridge University 1866–1907, with a Preface by Sir Archibald Geikie, New York: Dutton.
