= James Thomas Knowles (1831–1908) =

English architect and journal editor

Sir James Thomas Knowles KCVO (13 October 1831 – 13 February 1908) was an English architect and editor. He was intimate with the poet Alfred, Lord Tennyson and the founder of the Metaphysical Society to encourage rapprochement between religion and science.

== Life ==
James Knowles was born in London, the son of the architect James Thomas Knowles (1806–1884), and himself trained in architecture at University College and in Italy. Among the buildings he designed were three churches in Clapham, South London, Mark Masons' Hall, London (later the Thatched House Club), Lord Tennyson's house at Aldworth, the Leicester Square garden (as restored at the expense of Albert Grant), Albert Mansions, Victoria Street in Westminster, and an 1882 enlargement of the Royal Sea Bathing Hospital at Margate in Kent.

However, he also developed a literary career. In 1860 he published The Story of King Arthur. In 1866 he was introduced to Alfred Lord Tennyson and later agreed to design his new house with the condition that there was not any fee. This resulted in a close friendship, Knowles assisting Tennyson with business matters, and among other things helping to design scenery for the play The Cup, when Henry Irving produced it in 1880.

Knowles corresponded with a number of the most interesting men of the day, and in 1869, with Tennyson's cooperation, he initiated the Metaphysical Society, the object of which was to attempt some intellectual rapprochement between religion and science by inviting major representatives of faith and unfaith to meet and exchange opinions. Members included Tennyson, Gladstone, W. K. Clifford, W. G. Ward, John Morley, Cardinal Manning, Archbishop Thomson, T. H. Huxley, Arthur Balfour, Leslie Stephen, and Sir William Gull. The society included many men who became contributors to magazines edited by Knowles.

In 1870 he succeeded Dean Alford as editor of the Contemporary Review, but quit it in 1877 owing to the objection of the proprietors to the inclusion of articles (by W. K. Clifford notably) attacking Theism, and he initiated the Nineteenth Century (to the title of which, in 1901, were added the words And After). Both periodicals became influential while he was editor of them, and were the new sort of monthly review which replaced the popularity of the quarterlies. For example, it helped halt the Channel Tunnel project, by publishing a protest signed by many distinguished men in 1882. In 1904 he received a knighthood. He was a considerable collector of works of art.

Knowles was married twice, first in 1860 to Jane Borradaile, then in 1865 to Isabel Hewlett. He died in Brighton and was buried at the Brighton Extra Mural Cemetery.
