= National Review (1855) =

British quarterly magazine (1855–1864)

The National Review was a quarterly British magazine published between 1855 and 1864. The magazine was founded and joint-edited by journalists Walter Bagehot and Richard Holt Hutton.

It published one of the first reviews of Charles Darwin's Origin of Species, by William Benjamin Carpenter.
