= Walter Bagehot =

English journalist and writer (1826–1877)

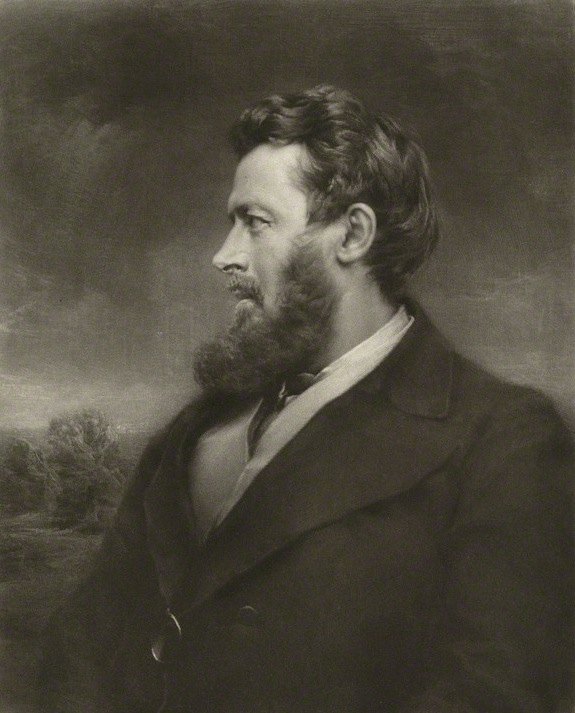
- Portrait by Norman Hirst, after an unknown artist
- Born: 3 February 1826; Langport, Somerset, England
- Died: 24 March 1877 (aged 51); Langport, Somerset, England
- Education: University College London
- Occupations: Businessman; essayist; journalist
- Political party: Liberal
- Spouse: Elizabeth (Eliza) Wilson (m. 1858)

Walter Bagehot (/ˈbædʒət/ BAJ-ət; 3 February 1826 – 24 March 1877) was an English journalist, businessman, and essayist, who wrote extensively about government, economics, literature and race. He is known for co-founding the National Review in 1855, and for his works The English Constitution and Lombard Street: A Description of the Money Market (1873).

== Life ==
Bagehot was born in Langport, Somerset, England, on 3 February 1826. His father, Thomas Watson Bagehot, was managing director and vice-chairman of Stuckey's Bank. He attended University College London (UCL), where he studied mathematics and, in 1848, earned a master's degree in moral philosophy. Bagehot was called to the Bar by Lincoln's Inn, but preferred to join his father in 1852 in his family's shipping and banking business.

In 1858, Bagehot married Elizabeth (Eliza) Wilson (1832–1921), whose father, James Wilson, was the founder and owner of The Economist. The couple were happily married until Bagehot's untimely death at age 51, but had no children. A collection of their love-letters was published in 1933.

=== Journalism ===
In 1855, Bagehot founded the National Review with his friend Richard Holt Hutton. In 1861, he became editor-in-chief of The Economist. In the 16 years he served as its editor, Bagehot expanded the reporting of politics by The Economist, and increased its influence among policy-makers. He was widely accepted by the British establishment and was elected to the Athenaeum in 1875.

He considered himself a "conservative Liberal or 'between size in politics.'"

=== Works ===
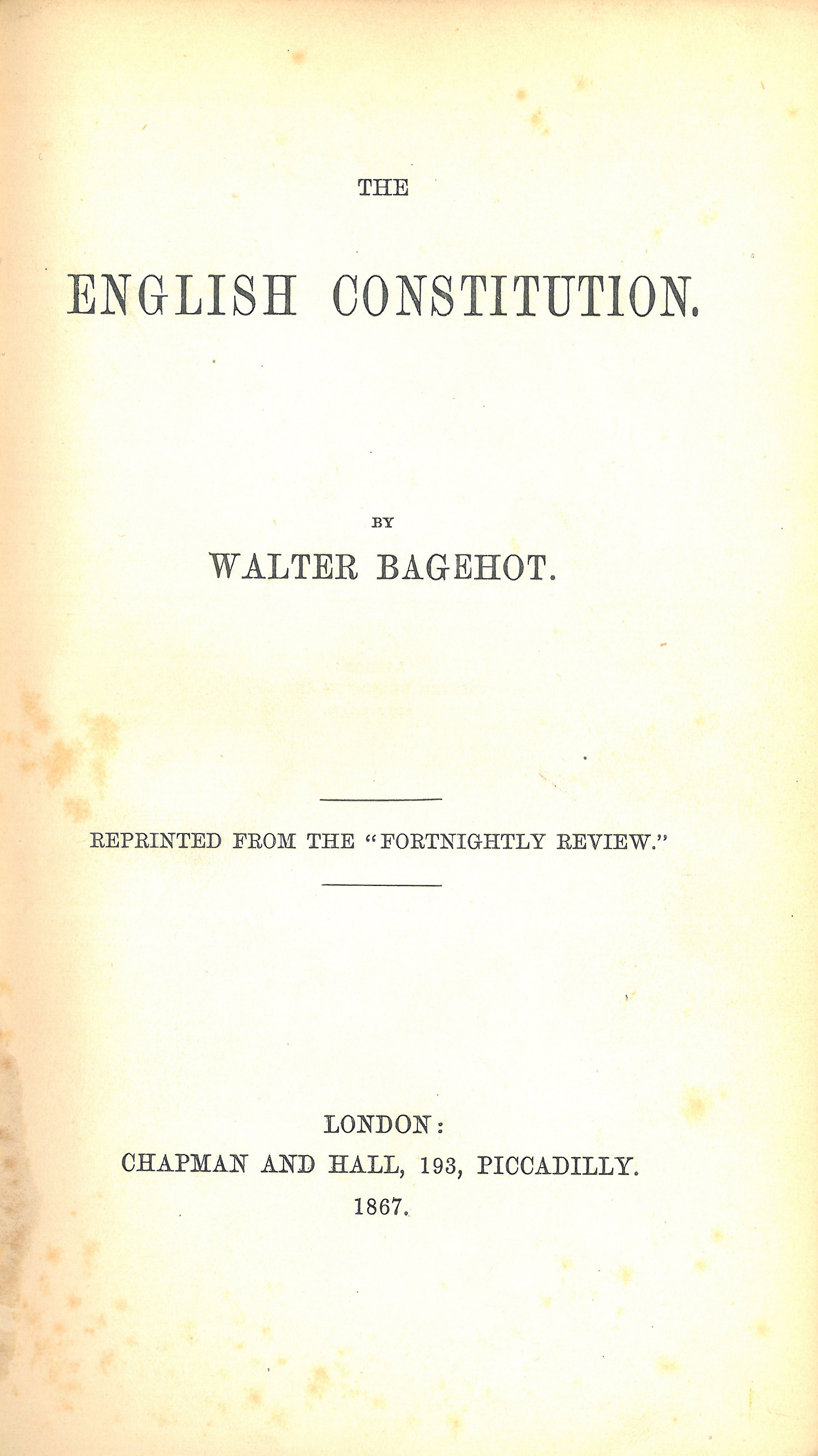
Title page of the first edition of Bagehot's The English Constitution, 1867

In 1867, Bagehot wrote The English Constitution, a book that explores the nature of the constitution of the United Kingdom, specifically its Parliament and monarchy. It appeared at the same time that Parliament enacted the Reform Act 1867, requiring Bagehot to write an extended introduction to the second edition which appeared in 1872.

Bagehot also wrote Physics and Politics (1872), in which he examines how civilisations sustain themselves, arguing that, in their earliest phase, civilisations are very much in opposition to the values of modern liberalism, insofar as they are sustained by conformism and military success but, once they are secured, it is possible for them to mature into systems which allow for greater diversity and freedom.

His viewpoint was based on his distinction between the qualities of an "accomplished man" and those of a "rude man", which he considered to be the result of iterative inheritances by which the "nervous organisation" of the individual became increasingly refined down through the generations. He regarded that distinction as a moral achievement whereby, through the actions of the will, the "accomplished" elite was able to morally differentiate themselves from "rude men" by a "hereditary drill". He equally applied such reasoning to develop a form of pseudoscientific racism, whereby those of mixed race lacked any "inherited creed" or "fixed traditional sentiments" upon which, he considered, human nature depended.

He attempted to provide empirical support for his views by citing John Lubbock and Edward Tylor although, in their writings on human evolution, neither of them accepted arguments for innate hereditary differences, as opposed to cultural inheritance. Tylor, in particular, rejected Bagehot's view of the centrality of physical heredity, or that the modern "savage" mind had become "tattooed over with monstrous images" by which base instincts had been preserved in crevices, as opposed to accomplished European man, for whom such instincts had been smoothed away through the inherited will to exercise reason.

In Lombard Street: A Description of the Money Market (1873) Bagehot seeks to explain the world of finance and banking. His observations on finance are often cited by central bankers, in particular in the period after the 2008 financial crisis. More specifically, there was particular popularity "Bagehot's dictum" that in times of crisis of the financial system, central banks should lend freely to solvent depository institutions, yet only against sound collateral and at interest rates high enough to dissuade those borrowers that are not genuinely in need.

=== Death ===
Bagehot never fully recovered from a bout of pneumonia he suffered in 1867, and he died in 1877 from complications of what was said to be a cold.

=== Legacy ===
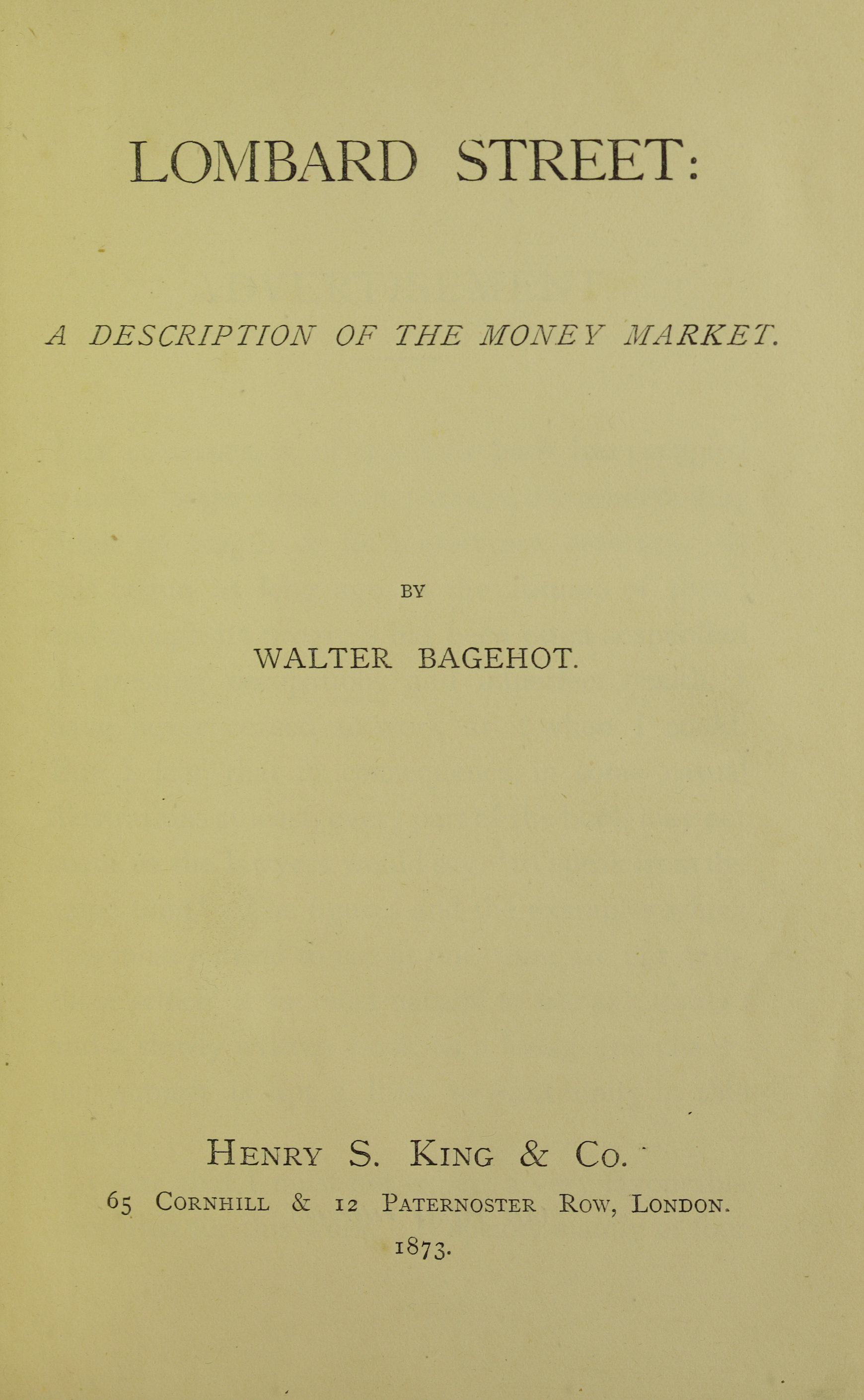
Lombard Street, 1873

Collections of Bagehot's literary, political, and economic essays were published after his death. Their subjects ranged from Shakespeare and Disraeli to the price of silver. Every year, the British Political Studies Association awards the Walter Bagehot Prize for the best dissertation in the field of government and public administration.

Bagehot's collected works were issued in a set of 15 volumes, published by The Economist between 1965 and 1986, and edited by Norman St. John-Stevas.

Minor planet 2901 Bagehot, discovered by Luboš Kohoutek, is named in his honour.

The Economist carries a weekly current affairs commentary entitled "Bagehot", which is named in his honour and is described as "an analysis of British life and politics, in the tradition of Walter Bagehot". As of January 2022, the column has been written by Duncan Robinson, political editor of the publication.

==== Commemoration in Langport ====
The Langport and District History Society commemorates Langport's most famous citizen. As well as a section of its website dedicated to Bagehot, and a new book in 2026 to commemorate the bicentenary of Bagehot's birth, the Society has undertaken a series of projects in the town. These include successfully requesting Langport Town Council to rename the Town Garden in Bagehot's memory in 2012; restoring the 1916 stone plaque above Bagehot's birthplace, Bank Chambers in Cheapside, and installing a series of three illustrated Interpretation Boards on key sites in the town. They are Walter Bagehot: a Langport man, and international figure (Walter Bagehot Town Garden, 2013); The Bagehots and the Stuckeys: two notable Langport families (All Saints' Churchyard, 2024), Great Bow Wharf: Langport’s commercial hub (Great Bow Wharf, 2025).

== Major publications ==
- (1848). "Principles of Political Economy," The Prospective Review, Vol. 4, No. 16, pp. 460–502.
- (1858). Estimates of Some Englishmen and Scotchmen.
- (1867; second edition, 1872). The English Constitution. (online)
- (1872). Physics and Politics (online).
- (1873). Lombard Street: A Description of the Money Market. (online)
- (1875). "A New Standard of Value," The Economist, Vol. 33, No. 1682, pp. 1361–63.
- (1877). Some Articles on the Depreciation of Silver and on Topics Connected with It.
- (1879). Literary Studies.
  - Volume I
  - Volume II
- (1880). Economic Studies.
- (1881). Biographical Studies.
- (1885). The Postulates of English Political Economy.
- (1889). The Works of Walter Bagehot.
- (1933). The Love Letters of Walter Bagehot and Eliza Wilson (with his spouse).
