= Darwin Industry =

Specialty in history of science

The Darwin Industry refers to historical scholarship about, and the large community of historians of science working on, Charles Darwin's life, work, and influence. The term "has a slightly derogatory connotation, as if the scale of the research has gotten out of control with people cranking out studies on perhaps less and less important aspects of Darwin's work"; but it was originally a self-designation of the scholars who began re-evaluating Darwin and studying his manuscripts and correspondence in the second half of the 20th century.

== Darwin's manuscripts and correspondence ==
One of the most significant projects of the Darwin Industry has been the systematic publication of all of Darwin's unpublished writings. Two volumes of the Life and Letters of Charles Darwin were published in 1887 along with The Autobiography of Charles Darwin, edited by Francis Darwin; two volumes of More Letters of Charles Darwin were published in 1902. Francis Darwin edited 1909 editions of Darwin's notebooks related to the inception of his theory. Darwin's granddaughter Nora Barlow pieced together the 1930 Diary of the Beagle from Darwin's unpublished notebooks. A flood of Darwiniana was published in the mid-twentieth century, especially by Darwin's descendants, leading up to the 1959 Darwin Centennial, including an un-redacted edition of Darwin's autobiography edited by Barlow. However, all this made up only a fraction of Darwin's correspondence and other unpublished writings, and much of what was published was incomplete. By the 1990s there were two different versions of The Works of Charles Darwin, an 18 volume edition by AMS Press and a more scholarly 29 volume edition by William Pickering, along with an annotated scholarly volume of Charles Darwin 's Notebooks, 1836-1844.

More significantly, two projects now make most of the primary material relating to Darwin available. Since 1974 the Darwin Correspondence Project has been locating, annotating and publishing the complete surviving correspondence of Darwin, including sixteen volumes (of an expected 30) published between 1985 and 2008 (covering the letters through 1868). An online database makes notes and transcripts of letters available online. The Complete Works of Charles Darwin Online makes available all of Darwin's print publications, private papers and manuscripts, together with a growing number of supplementary works. Earlier volumes of published letters are included, but it does not duplicate the Correspondence Project publications. It began in 2002 as a pilot website, The writings of Charles Darwin on the web, and in October 2006 it was launched internationally as a new website. It is claimed to be the largest and most widely used Darwin resource ever created.

== Biographies ==
A substantial number of Darwin biographies were published before the 1959 Darwin Centennial, but from then until the 1990s, the Darwin Industry had produced only a handful of substantial Darwin biographies, several of which had unusual aspects (such as speculations about Darwin's sex life and psychoanalytic interpretations of his illnesses). Much of the biographical work of Darwin scholars was focused on specific instances and historical problems related to Darwin's life (and published as articles or monographs). Since the 1990s, at least three well-received scholarly biographies have been produced: Darwin (1991) by Adrian Desmond and James Moore (with the alternative title Darwin: The Life of a Tormented Evolutionist when published in America); Charles Darwin: The Man and His Influence (1996) by Peter J. Bowler; and Janet Browne's two-volume biography, Charles Darwin: Voyaging (1995) and Charles Darwin: The Power of Place (2002). With the 2005 publication of Sandra Herbert's Charles Darwin: Geologist, some scholars are questioning whether this is, or ought to be, the end of the Darwin Industry, since most of Darwin's life and work has been explored so exhaustively; however, Darwin scholars see continuing potential, especially since Darwin's complete manuscripts are not yet published and because "Darwin was exceptional and inspirational".

== Darwin-related topics ==
The Darwin Industry has also stretched to many related figures before, during and after Darwin's time. Darwin's grandfather Erasmus Darwin has been a subject of great interest, and the broad philosophical currents of Naturphilosophie and Romanticism in science during the 19th century are still being explored. Studies of Jean-Baptiste Lamarck, Georges Cuvier, Charles Lyell, Thomas Henry Huxley, Richard Owen, Alfred Russel Wallace and many others have all been influenced to a greater or lesser degree by the work of the Darwin Industry. Because of the unusual hybrid nature of The Origin of Species as both a popular and scientific work, one major focus of the Darwin Industry has been the role of popularization and education in the spread of Darwin's theory: the popular work of Huxley, Ernst Haeckel, Herbert Spencer, and most dramatically, Robert Chambers (who wrote the 1844 sensation Vestiges of the Natural History of Creation), is increasingly seen as important in its own right in the history of evolutionary thought.
