= More Letters of Charles Darwin =

Two-volume publication by Charles Darwin

More Letters of Charles Darwin, a sequel to The Life and Letters of Charles Darwin of 1887, was a book in two volumes, published in 1903, edited by Francis Darwin and Albert Seward, containing as the title implies, additional publications of 782 letters from the correspondence of Charles Darwin.

The Times noted that "the two volumes of More Letters of Charles Darwin form a fitting supplement to The Life and Letters", which it had in turn described as "one of the best biographies ever written". In the Darwin letters trilogy it was followed by Emma Darwin: A Century of Family Letters (1905/1915).

R. B. Freeman noted that it "contains almost entirely new matter although some extracts and a few whole letters are also found in Life and letters. It also contains a brief autobiographical piece (pp. 1-5) which is sometimes found in modern editions and translations of his main autobiography."

The book is dedicated "with affection and respect, to Joseph Hooker in remembrance of his lifelong friendship with Charles Darwin".

It contains a timeline of Darwin's life.

The Darwin Correspondence Project has further letters available, many published online.

== List of correspondents ==
Letters to or from the following individuals were included in the publication:

=== A ===
- Alexander Agassiz (American scientist)
- Hubert Airy
- Isaac Anderson-Henry
- David Thomas Ansted (geologist)
- Duke of Argyll

=== B ===
- Francis Maitland Balfour
- Abraham Dee Bartlett
- H. W. Bates
- Thomas Belt
- George Bentham
- M. J. Berkeley
- Leonard Blomefield
- William Bowman
- Heinrich Georg Bronn
- T. Lauder Brunton
- Axel Gudbrand Blytt

=== C ===
- Alphonse Louis Pierre Pyramus de Candolle
- Julius Viktor Carus
- Robert Chambers
- John Collier
- Edward Cresy
- Walter Drawbridge Crick
- James Croll

=== D ===
- J. D. Dana
- Camille Dareste
- Caroline Darwin (sister)
- Emma Darwin (wife and cousin)
- Erasmus Alvey Darwin (brother)
- Robert Darwin (father)
- William Erasmus Darwin (eldest son)
- Federico Delpino
- Mary Catherine Stanley, Lady Derby
- Horace Dobell
- Frans Cornelis Donders

=== E ===
- Léo Abram Errera

=== F ===
- Hugh Falconer
- Jean-Henri Fabre
- Thomas Farrer, 1st Baron Farrer (statistician, father by his first wife of Ida who married Darwin's son Horace, and whose second wife Katherine was Emma's niece, and hence also Darwin's first cousin once removed.)
- Frederic William Farrar
- Henry Fawcett
- W. H. Flower
- John Fiske
- Edward Forbes
- George Fraser

=== G ===
- Francis Galton (statistician, half-cousin)
- A. Gapitche
- George Arthur Gaskell
- Albert Gaudry
- James Geikie
- Joseph Henry Gilbert
- Philip Henry Gosse
- Asa Gray
- William Rathbone Greg
- Sir Richard Gregory, 1st Baronet, as "The Editor of Nature"

=== H ===
- Ernst Haeckel
- W. H. Harvey
- Alpheus Hyatt
- Oswald Heer
- J. S. Henslow
- Friedrich Hildebrand
- Luke Hindmarsh
- Karl Höchberg
- Leonard Horner
- Joseph Dalton Hooker
- William Jackson Hooker (son of Joseph Dalton Hooker)
- William Horsfall
- Frederick Hutton
- T. H. Huxley

=== J ===
- G. Jäger
- J. W. Judd
- John Jenner Weir

=== K ===
- Ernst Krause

=== L ===
- James Lamont
- E. Ray Lankester
- G. H. Lewes
- John Lindley
- John Lubbock, 1st Baron Avebury
- Friedrich Ludwig
- Charles Lyell
- Katharine Murray Lyell (as "Mrs Lyell", Charles Lyell's sister-in-law)
- Mary Horner Lyell (wife of Charles Lyell)

=== M ===
- Daniel Mackintosh
- Maxwell Masters
- David Milne-Hume
- Raphael Meldola
- Thomas Meehan
- John Traherne Moggridge
- Johann August Georg Edmund Mojsisovics von Mojsvar
- Alexander Goodman More
- Henry Nottidge Moseley
- William Hallowes Miller
- Fritz Müller
- Hermann Müller (German botanist)
- Max Müller
- Roderick Murchison
- George B. Murdoch
- John Morley

=== O ===
- William Ogle
- Daniel Oliver
- Richard Owen (palaeontologist, opponent of the theory of evolution)

=== P ===
- James Paget
- Josef Popper
- Samuel Tolver Preston
- Joseph Prestwich
- Lyon Playfair, 1st Baron Playfair

=== Q ===
- Jean Louis Armand de Quatrefages de Bréau

=== R ===
- Thomas Mellard Reade
- Anthony Rich
- George Rolleston
- G. J. Romanes
- John Forbes Royle
- Charles Valentine Riley
- Thomas Rivers

=== S ===
- John Burdon-Sanderson
- Louis Charles Joseph Gaston de Saporta, Comte de Saporta
- Karl Semper
- John Scott
- Hermann Gustav Settegast
- William Sharpey (Note: Letter published was from Falconer to Sharpey)
- James Shaw
- Sydney Barber Josiah Skertchly
- Herbert Spencer
- Edward Sylvester Morse

=== T ===
- Lawson Tait
- William Chester Tait
- Emily Fairbanks Talbot
- William Bernhard Tegetmeier
- W. T. Thiselton Dyer (Note: W.T. THISELTON-DYER TO THE EDITOR OF NATURE.)
- G. H. K. Thwaites
- James Torbitt
- Daniel Hack Tuke
- Sir William Turner

=== V ===
- Hermann Vöchting (German botanist)

=== W ===
- Josiah Wedgwood II (maternal uncle)
- August Weismann
- Julius Wiesner
- Alfred Russel Wallace
- H. M. Wallis
- Benjamin Dann Walsh
- R. G. Whiteman
- Alexander Stephen Wilson
- Charles Henry Lardner Woodd
- Samuel Pickworth Woodward
- Francis Buchanan White
- Chauncey Wright

=== Z ===
- Otto Zacharias (German zoologist)
