= Emma Darwin: A Century of Family Letters =

Two volume book edited by Henrietta Litchfield

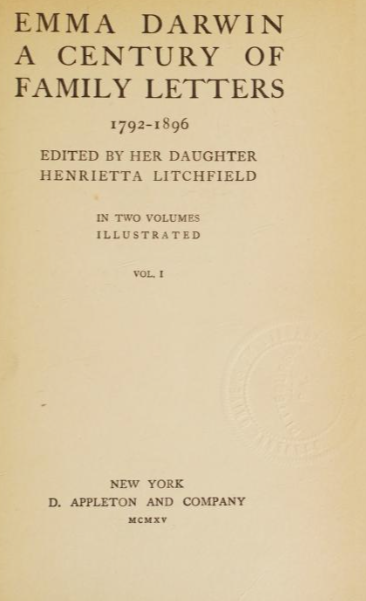
- Title page for Emma Darwin: A Century of Family Letters (1915)
- Editor: Henrietta Litchfield
- Subject: Emma Darwin
- Publisher: John Murray
- Publication date: 1904

Emma Darwin: A Century of Family Letters 1792-1896 is a book in two volumes, edited by Henrietta Litchfield about her mother, Emma Darwin (née Wedgwood) and letters from their family. It was originally privately published in 1904 as Emma Darwin, Wife of Charles Darwin: A Century of Family Letters, but was publicly published under the shorter title in 1915 by John Murray.

== Dramatis personae ==
=== Mother's family ===
The book covers the life of Emma Darwin (1808–1896) but starts from 1796 with Emma's family background and the nine Allen sisters of Creselly, Pembrokeshire, and their two brothers. These, Emma's mother, aunts and uncles, were the children of John Bartlett Allen (1733–1803), and his first wife (married 1763) Elizabeth (née Hensleigh, c. 1738-1790), Emma's maternal grandparents:

- Elizabeth Allen (1764–1846), mother of Emma Darwin and the wife of Josiah Wedgwood II.
- Catherine Allen (1765–1830) aunt, known as Kitty; second wife of Sir James Mackintosh)
- Caroline Allen (1768–1835), aunt, married Rev. Edward Drewe
- John Hensleigh Allen (1769–1843), uncle, sometime Whig Member of Parliament
- Louisa Jane Allen (1771–1836), aunt, also known as "Jenny", married John Wedgwood, the brother of Josiah Wedgwood II.
- Lancelot Baugh Allen (1774–1853), uncle, Master of Dulwich College.
- Harriet Allen (1776–1845), aunt, wife of Matthew Surtees, Rector of North Cerney.
- Jessica Allen (1777–1853), aunt, known as "Jessie"; wife of Jean Charles Léonard de Sismondi
- Octavia Allen (1779–1800), aunt, died aged 20 unmarried, predeceasing Emma's birth.
- Emma Augusta Allen (1780–1864), aunt, unmarried.
- Frances Allen (1781–1875), aunt, known as "Fanny"; unmarried.

John Hensleigh Allen (uncle) had the following children (first cousins to Emma):

- Seymour Phillips Allen (1814–1861), first cousin, of Cresselly, married Catherine Fellowes, daughter of Newton Fellowes, 4th Earl of Portsmouth.
- Henry George Allen (1815–1908), first cousin.
- John Hensleigh Allen (1818–1868), first cousin, not to be confused with his father.
- Isabella Georgina (1820–1914), first cousin, married George Lort Phillips of Laurenny.

Sir James and Lady Mackintosh (aunt) had the following children, also first cousins to Emma:

- Bessy Mackintosh (1799–1823), first cousin, unmarried.
- Fanny Mackintosh (1800–1889), first cousin, married her cousin Hensleigh Wedgwood.
- Robert James Mackintosh (1806–1864), first cousin married Mary Appleton, daughter of Nathan Appleton.

Caroline Drewe, (aunt), had the following children, also first cousins to Emma:

- Harriet Drewe (1779–1857), first cousin, married Robert Gifford, 1st Baron Gifford
- Georgina Catherine Drewe (1791–1871), married (1857) Robert Gascoyne-Cecil, 3rd Marquess of Salisbury
- Edward Drewe(), married Adèle Prévost.
- and others.

=== Father's family ===
Josiah Wedgwood, Emma's paternal grandfather had the following children:

- Susannah Wedgwood (1765–1817), aunt, married Dr Robert Darwin - Charles Darwin, Emma's husband and first cousin, was their son.
- John Wedgwood (horticulturalist) (1766–1844), uncle, married Jane Allen.
- Josiah Wedgwood II (1769–1843), father, married Elizabeth Allen.
- Thomas Wedgwood (1771–1805), uncle.
- Catherine (Kitty) (1774–1823), aunt, was unmarried.
- Sarah Elizabeth (1778–1856), aunt, was unmarried.

== Reception ==
The book also contains many letters from the correspondence of Charles Darwin, Emma's husband. It is therefore a very early example of a Darwin Industry book, along with The Life and Letters of Charles Darwin which was edited by Charles's son (and Etty's brother) Sir Francis Darwin, and More Letters of Charles Darwin edited by Frank and Albert Seward.

The book was dedicated by Etty to her niece, Emma's granddaughter, Frances Cornford.

The Times described it as "an admirable piece of work, in which the editor, while largely effacing herself, yet gave a notable picture of an interesting family life".

The book was reviewed in The Eugenics Review by Albert Seward who concluded that the book "bring[s] to us into the closest touch with wise and attractive personalities and at the same time they record facts of great scientific interest".

In R. B. Freeman's Charles Darwin bibliography, he noted that the publication "contains a large number of letters from Charles and is an important source of information about his day to day and family life".

The 1915 edition also contains a brief biography of Erasmus Darwin IV, Emma's grandson who had been recently killed in the First World War.
