= Settegast (surname) =

Settegast is a surname. Notable people with the surname include:

- Hermann Settegast (1819–1908), German agronomist
- Joseph Anton Settegast (1813–1890), German church painter
- Mary Settegast (1934–2020), American scholar and author
