= Prestwich (disambiguation) =

Prestwich is a town in Greater Manchester, England.

Prestwich may also refer to:

== People ==
- Prestwich baronets, an English baronetcy, including a list of people who bore the title
- Grace Prestwich (1832–1899), Scottish author and illustrator
- James Caldwell Prestwich (1852–1940), English architect
- John Alfred Prestwich (1874–1952), English engineer and inventor
- Joseph Prestwich (1912–1896), British geologist and businessman
- J. O. Prestwich (1914–2003), British medievalist
- Michael Prestwich (born 1943), British medievalist, son of J.O.
- Steve Prestwich (1954–2011), British-Australian musician
- Dawn Prestwich (fl. 1992–2017), American television writer and producer

== Other ==
- Prestwich-cum-Oldham, an ancient parish in Lancashire
- Prestwich (UK Parliament constituency), a former parliamentary constituency including Prestwich
- Middleton and Prestwich (UK Parliament constituency), a former parliamentary constituency including Prestwich
