= The Life and Letters of Charles Darwin =

Book about Charles Darwin by Frances Darwin

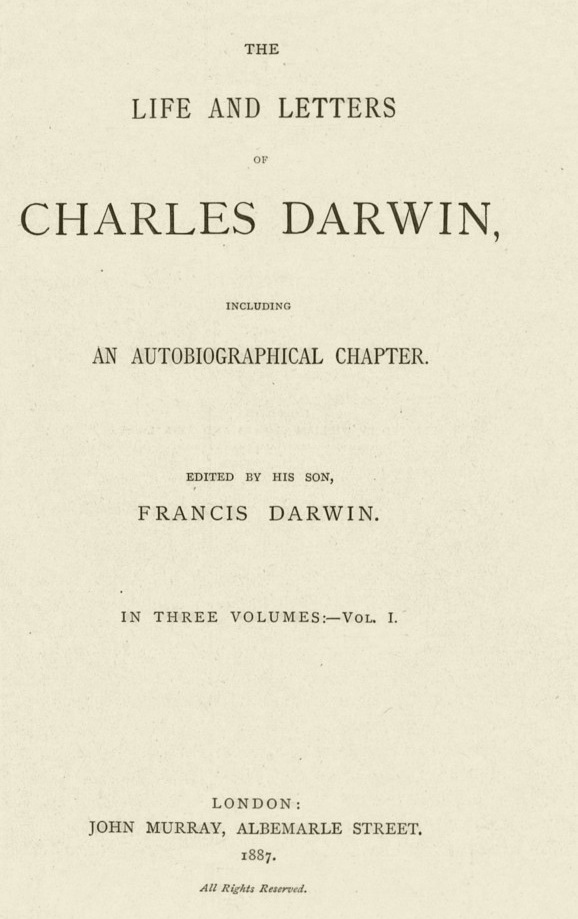
Title page of the original edition of Charles Darwin’s autobiography, published 1887.

The Life and Letters of Charles Darwin is a book published in 1887 edited by Francis Darwin about his father Charles Darwin. It contains a selection of 87 letters from the correspondence of Charles Darwin, an autobiographical chapter written by Charles Darwin for his family, and an essay by Thomas Huxley "On the reception of the 'Origin of Species'".

== Book ==
It was published by Darwin's publisher John Murray.

The autobiographical chapter had begun as recollections, written for his own amusement and for his descendants, initially as 121 pages written between May and August, 1876, and expanded during the remaining six years of his life. It was edited by Francis to remove references to his father's views on religion. These were later reinstated and published as The Autobiography of Charles Darwin in 1958 by Charles's granddaughter (and Francis's niece) Nora Barlow.

The book was the first real biography of Charles Darwin, excepting obituaries, and thus the foundation of the Darwin Industry.

Further volumes of letters followed - More Letters of Charles Darwin in 1903. Charles's wife Emma Darwin's correspondence was published by Charles and Emma's daughter (Frank's sister) Henrietta Litchfield in 1905/1915 as Emma Darwin: A Century of Family Letters.

The book received extensive reviews in The Times and The Manchester Guardian

The book was later described by The Times as "one of the best biographies ever written" and "In the selection and arrangement of the material he [Francis Darwin] was chiefly guided by a wish to portray his father's personal character, and he succeeded in a remarkable degree in giving a true picture of the man and the student, the methods of Darwin's work and the gradual development of his opinions."

== Correspondents ==
Letters to and/or from the following 27 men and one woman are included:

- Louis Agassiz
- H. W. Bates
- H. G. Bronn
- Alphonse Pyramus de Candolle
- W. B. Carpenter
- Emma Darwin (wife and cousin)
- Erasmus Alvey Darwin (brother)
- Thomas Davidson
- William Darwin Fox (cousin)
- Hugh Falconer
- Asa Gray
- J. S. Henslow
- Joseph Dalton Hooker
- Sir Henry Holland, 1st Baronet (cousin)
- Thomas Henry Huxley
- Leonard Jenyns
- Charles Kingsley
- Charles Lyell
- John Lubbock, 1st Baron Avebury
- Maxwell Masters
- John Murray II
- Joseph Prestwich
- Rev. J. M. Rodwell
- Adam Sedgwick
- Herbert Spencer
- Alfred Russel Wallace
- Frederick Watkins
- H. C. Watson
