= Daniel McIntosh =

Daniel McIntosh may refer to:

- Danny McIntosh (born 1980), British boxer
- D. N. McIntosh (1822–1896), Creek farmer and politician

== See also ==
- Daniel Mackintosh (1815–1891), Scottish geomorphologist and ethnologist
