= Paul Sorauer =

German botanist (1839–1916)

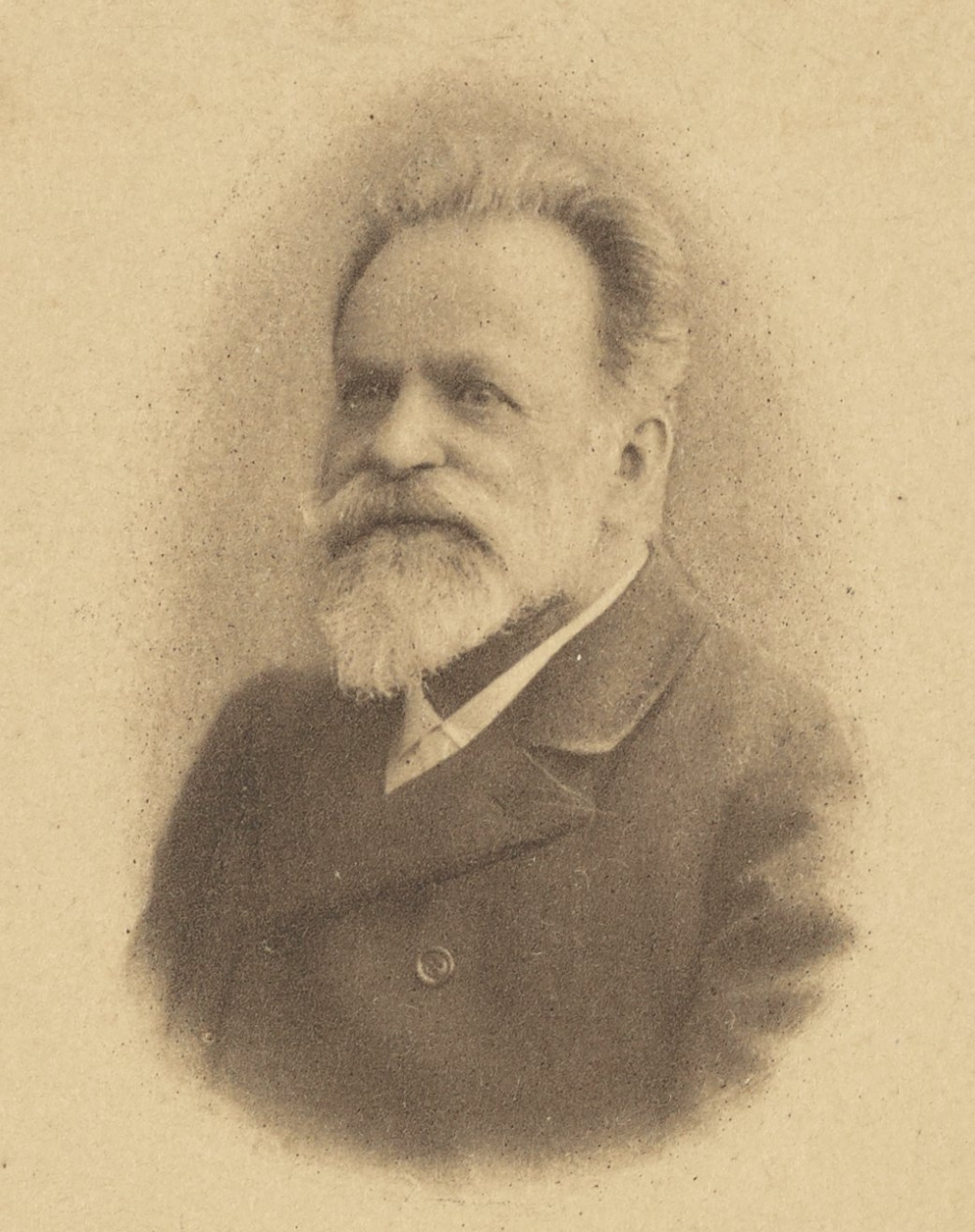
c. 1900

Paul Carl Moritz Sorauer (9 June 1839 – 9 January 1916) was a German botanist and plant pathologist. He was a professor of botany at Berlin and wrote an influential multi-volume handbook on plant diseases in 1874 which went into several editions and was also translated into English.

== Life and work ==
Sorauer was born in Breslau, son of carpenter Carl Joseph and Wilhelmine, he went to school at Zwinger and then at the Friedrichs-Gymnasium in Breslau developing an interest in plants and gardening. He then went to study natural sciences at Berlin in 1862 and received a doctorate from the University of Rostock with studies on potato propagation in 1867. He also worked under Hermann Karsten and after Karsten moved to Vienna, Sorauer worked with dendrologist Karl Koch. He then worked at the Agricultural Research Station at Dahme under Hermann Hellriegel. He married Clara, daughter of a Dahme physician in 1870. In 1872 he became head of plant physiology at the Royal Pomological Institute at Proskau under Hermann Settegast. He also taught at the agricultural academy and became a professor in 1892, while also being elected into the Leopoldina academy. He resigned in 1893 due to eye troubles and moved to Berlin. In 1902 he was appointed as a private lecturer at the University of Berlin.

Sorauer published the Handbook of Plant Diseases in 1874 which went into three editions during his lifetime and was continued by others after as well. He founded the journal Zeitschrift für Pflanzenkrankheiten in 1891.
