= Darwin: The Life of a Tormented Evolutionist =

1991 book by Adrian Desmond and James Moore

- First edition
- Author: Adrian Desmond, James Moore
- Language: English
- Subject: Charles Darwin
- Genre: Biography
- Publisher: Viking Penguin
- Publication date: 1991
- Publication place: United Kingdom
- Pages: 808
- ISBN: 0-393-31150-3

Darwin: The Life of a Tormented Evolutionist is a biography of Charles Darwin by Adrian Desmond and James Moore. It is considered one of three scholarly biographies of Darwin, along with Charles Darwin: The Man and His Influence (1996) by Peter J. Bowler and Janet Browne's two-volume biography, Charles Darwin: Voyaging (1995) and Charles Darwin: The Power of Place (2002).

== See also ==
- Darwin Industry
