= Sebright chicken =

British breed of bantam chicken

Sebright
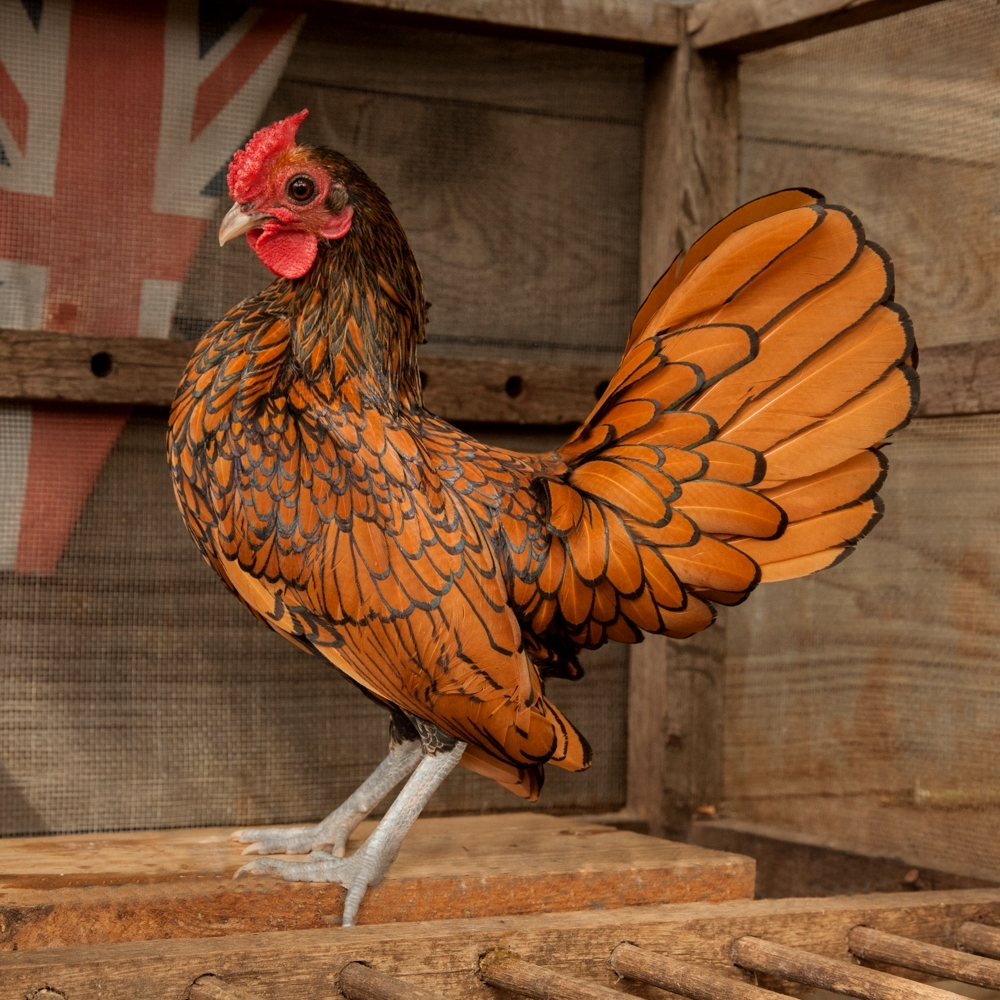
- A Golden Sebright cock
- Conservation status: RBST: watchlist; RBCSNZ: watchlist; RBTA: endangered
- Country of origin: United Kingdom
- Distribution: Worldwide
- Use: Fancy

Traits
- Weight: Male: 620 g; Female: 510 g
- Egg colour: White
- Comb type: Rose

Classification
- APA: Yes
- EE: yes
- PCGB: True bantam
- APS: True bantam softfeather light breed
- Chicken; Gallus gallus domesticus

The Sebright (IPA: /ˈsiːbraɪt/) is a British breed of bantam chicken. It is a true bantam – a miniature bird with no corresponding large version – and is one of the oldest recorded British bantam breeds. It is named after Sir John Saunders Sebright, who created it as an ornamental breed by selective breeding in the early nineteenth century.

The first poultry breed to have its own specialist club for enthusiasts, Sebrights were admitted to poultry exhibition standards not long after their establishment. Today, they are among the most popular of bantam breeds. Despite their popularity, Sebrights are often difficult to breed, and the inheritance of certain unique characteristics the breed carries has been studied scientifically. As a largely ornamental chicken, they lay tiny, white eggs and are not kept for meat production.

== History ==
=== Background ===
Sir John Saunders Sebright (1767–1846) was the 7th Sebright Baronet, and a Member of Parliament for Hertfordshire. In addition to breeding chickens, cattle and other animals, Sir John wrote several influential pamphlets on animal keeping and breeding: The Art of Improving the Breeds of Domestic Animals (1809), Observations upon Hawking (1826), and Observations upon the Instinct of Animals (1836).

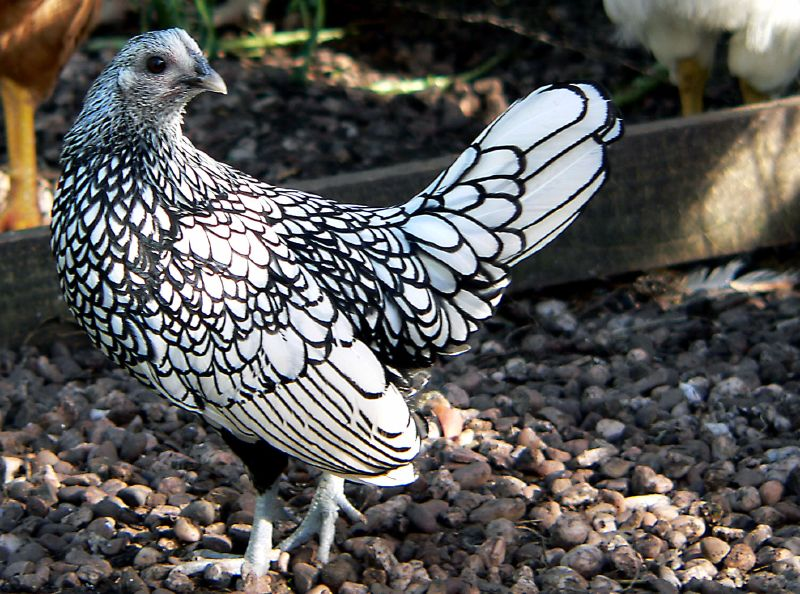
A Silver Sebright hen

Charles Darwin read Sir John's 1809 pamphlet, and was impressed with a passage that elaborated on how "the weak and the unhealthy do not live to propagate their infirmities". These writings, along with Darwin's correspondence via their mutual friend William Yarrell, aided Darwin in the inception of Darwin's theory of natural selection. Darwin's seminal work On the Origin of Species, first published in 1859, cited Sir John's experiments in pigeon breeding, and recalled "That most skilful breeder, Sir John Sebright, used to say, with respect to pigeons, that 'he would produce any given feather in three years, but it would take him six years to obtain head and beak.'" Darwin also cited Sir John extensively regarding the Sebright bantam, as well as pigeon and dog breeding, in his 1868 work Variation of Plants and Animals Under Domestication, his 1871 The Descent of Man, and Selection in Relation to Sex, and his book on Natural Selection (which was not published in his lifetime).

Sebright set out to create a very small bantam chicken with laced plumage similar that of the laced Polish. Although the exact makeup of the breed is uncertain, it is thought that he created the gold Sebright by cross-breeding a buff Nankin bantam hen, a small gold-spangled Hamburgh-like hen and a small hen-feathered Pit Game cock; he later created the silver Sebright by crossing his golds with a white Rosecomb cock bought from the new Zoological Gardens of the Zoological Society of London, established in 1826. It is also possible that the hen-feathering characteristic derived from the Belgian Campine breed rather than from Pit Game. In about 1810, Sebright founded The Sebright Bantam Club, which was the first single-breed association for chickens. In 1853 the Sebright was described in the Poultry Book of William Wingfield and George William Johnson, with an illustration by Harrison Weir. It was included in the original Standard of Excellence in Exhibition Poultry of William Bernhard Tegetmeier in 1865, and in the first Standard of Perfection of the American Poultry Association in 1874. Today, the breed is one of the ten most popular bantam chickens, according to the American Bantam Association.

== Characteristics ==
In accordance with the intentions of their creator, the Sebright is an ornamental bantam, and is commonly seen in competitive poultry shows. As a true bantam, all Sebrights are very small in stature; males weigh an average of 22 ounces (620 grams) and females 20 oz (570 g). Their short backs, proportionally large breasts, and downward-pointing wings combine to create an angular, jaunty look.

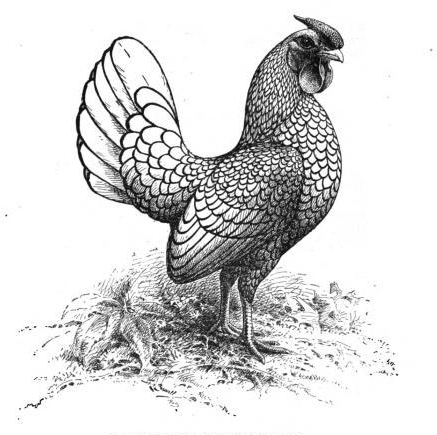
The ideal Silver Sebright male, from The Standard of Perfection

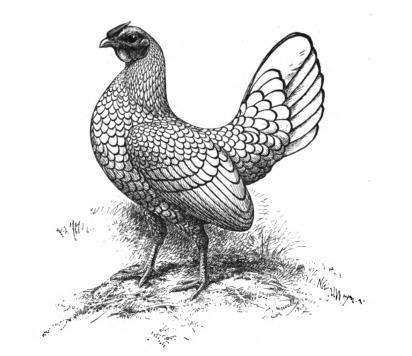
The ideal Silver Sebright female, from The Standard of Perfection

In the United Kingdom, two colour variants are recognised, gold and silver; these have a base of either dark gold or whitish silver, evenly laced around the edges with black. In other European countries other colours have been created: a black-laced lemon Sebright arose as a sport in Holland in the mid-twentieth century, and a chamois or white-laced buff variant was bred towards the end of the century; it is recognised by the Entente Européenne. The birds have unfeathered legs with slate-blue skin, and their beaks are ideally a dark horn colour. Cocks carry a rose comb covered with fine points, and a small spike that sweeps back from the head (called a leader). Combs, earlobes and wattles were originally a purple colour referred to in the fancy as mulberry, but today are often bright red though mulberry is still desired according to the standards in most countries. Some breeders consider hen feathering to have an adverse effect on the fertility of male Sebrights, and may use cocks that don't carry the trait for breeding purposes, despite their automatic disqualification in shows.

Characteristically, Sebrights are only one of a few chicken breeds in which the cocks are hen-feathered, meaning they have none of the long, sickle-shaped feathers common in most cocks that appear in the tail, neck and saddle. Due to the unique characteristic hen feathering, molecular biologists have found the Sebright bantam a useful model organism in the study of sex hormones. This is because they carry a mutation that causes the tissues of their skin to convert an unusually large amount of male sex hormones (androgens) into female sex hormones (oestrogens).

=== Husbandry ===
Sebrights are neither outstanding meat birds nor prolific egg layers – hens lay some 60–80 creamy-white eggs per year. They can prove to be particularly difficult to raise, especially for beginners. Hens rarely go broody and chicks usually have high mortality rates. Adults are generally hardy, but are especially susceptible to Marek's disease. Like many bantams, they fly well, so are sometimes kept in confinement, and not allowed to range freely. Due to their genetic makeup, males may on occasion be born infertile, further complicating breeding.

== See also ==
- List of chicken breeds
- Pigmy Pouter (An English breed of fancy pigeon believed to also be developed by Sir John Sebright though the subject is debatable)
- Campine (chicken) A small breed of chicken that also comes in gold and silver variants; is often compared to the Sebright.
- Hen feathering in cocks
