= Wallace Correspondence Project =

Project on Alfred Russel Wallace's correspondence

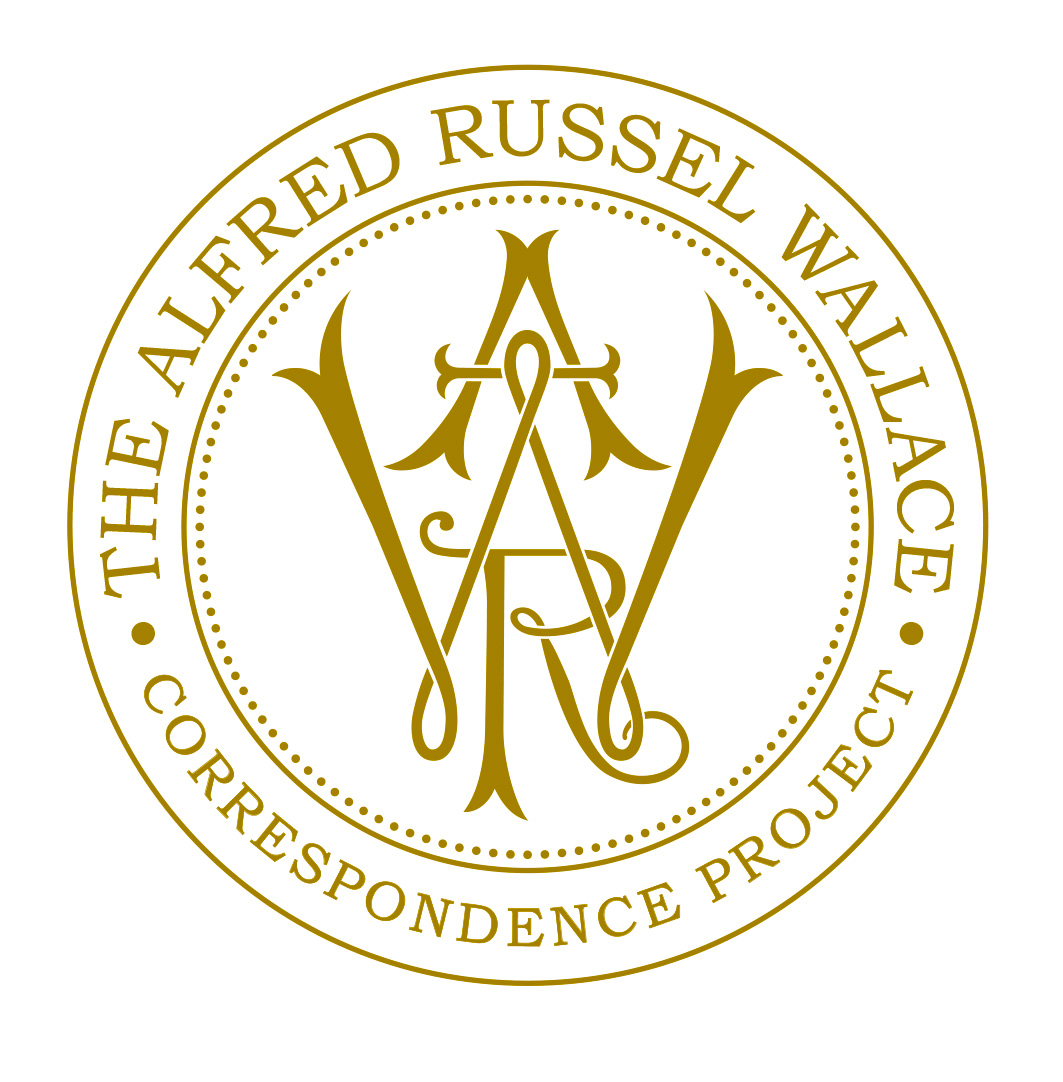
Logo of the Alfred Russel Wallace Correspondence Project.

The Alfred Russel Wallace Correspondence Project (WCP) is an ongoing scholarly initiative to create an archive (digital and in print) of the letters and manuscripts of Alfred Russel Wallace (1823–1913). Wallace, a 19th‑century British naturalist and explorer, is best known as the co‑discoverer (with Charles Darwin) of evolution by natural selection and as the "father" of evolutionary biogeography. The project's purpose is to locate, digitize, catalogue, transcribe and publish the surviving correspondence to and from Wallace, plus his other manuscripts such as notebooks, and make them freely accessible and searchable. It seeks to uncover new insights into Wallace's life and work — from evolutionary theory and biogeography, to social issues of the Victorian era.

== History ==
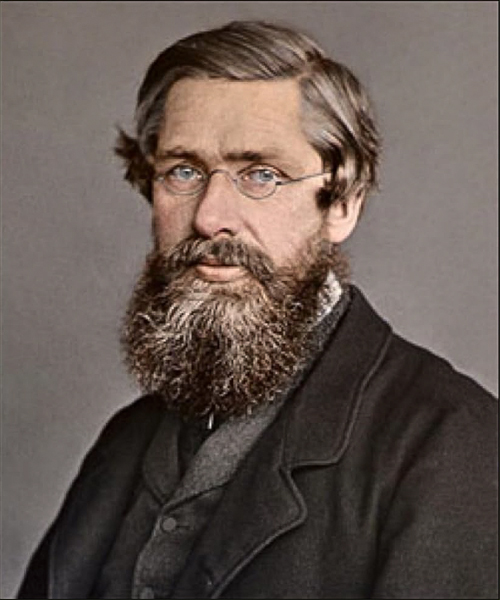
Alfred Russel Wallace, ca. 1869.

The idea of digitally preserving Wallace's letters dates to the early 2000s, when Wallace scholar Dr George Beccaloni (then based at the Natural History Museum, London), recognized that Wallace's correspondence (spanning decades of scholarly work and public life) was too important to remain scattered and inaccessible. By 2010 a formal project led by Beccaloni was initiated to digitise and transcribe every known letter to or from Wallace.

Using teams of researchers and volunteers, the project has successively identified and collected digital copies of Wallace's letters from archives and private collections worldwide. A public website called "Wallace Letters Online" (now defunct) was launched in 2013 to host scanned images and draft transcripts of the letters. In 2021 the project adopted a new digital platform called Epsilon, replacing the old portal. In 2023 the project published a 542‑page scholarly catalogue of Wallace's correspondence – the first listing of all known letters – further advancing its mission to organize and share the material.

== Archive content and scope ==
Wallace was a prolific correspondent. To date the project reports having obtained scans of 5,688 letters, including 2,748 letters written by Wallace and 2,159 letters sent to him, with the rest being related third-party documents. These letters were gathered from roughly 245 public and private archives around the world, plus a similar number of books and other publications, amounting to an estimated 95% of Wallace's surviving correspondence. The project also catalogues letters between other prominent scientists that mention Wallace (for example, correspondence from Charles Darwin or Thomas H. Huxley discussing Wallace) as well as letters by Wallace's close relatives, that shed light on his life.

This corpus of correspondence provides a unique "biographical treasure trove" of first-hand information. Compared to Wallace's published works (including his autobiography, which omits many personal details), the private letters reveal his personal views, scientific reasoning, and daily experiences in much richer detail. For example, Wallace's letters discuss fieldwork in the Amazon and Malay Archipelago, his development of key theories, his wide-ranging scientific interests (in glaciology, land reform, ethnography, spiritualism, etc.), and even private matters of family and friends.

By transcribing all these documents, the project makes the contents fully text-searchable, enabling scholars to trace themes and information across hundreds of letters.

== Digitization of the archive ==
The Wallace Correspondence Project uses modern digital humanities methods and infrastructure to manage the archive. All documents are photographed or scanned to produce high-resolution digital images, and detailed database records are created for each item. The text of each letter is transcribed according to a standardized protocol (preserving original wording and layout as much as possible).

The public access platform is the Epsilon database, a collaborative digital framework for nineteenth-century correspondence. Epsilon is a powerful web portal that can search Wallace's letters together with those of other scientists such as Charles Darwin. Users can perform full-text searches across Wallace's entire corpus of letters. In practice, this means a researcher can search for a term or topic and instantly find all occurrences in Wallace's correspondence.

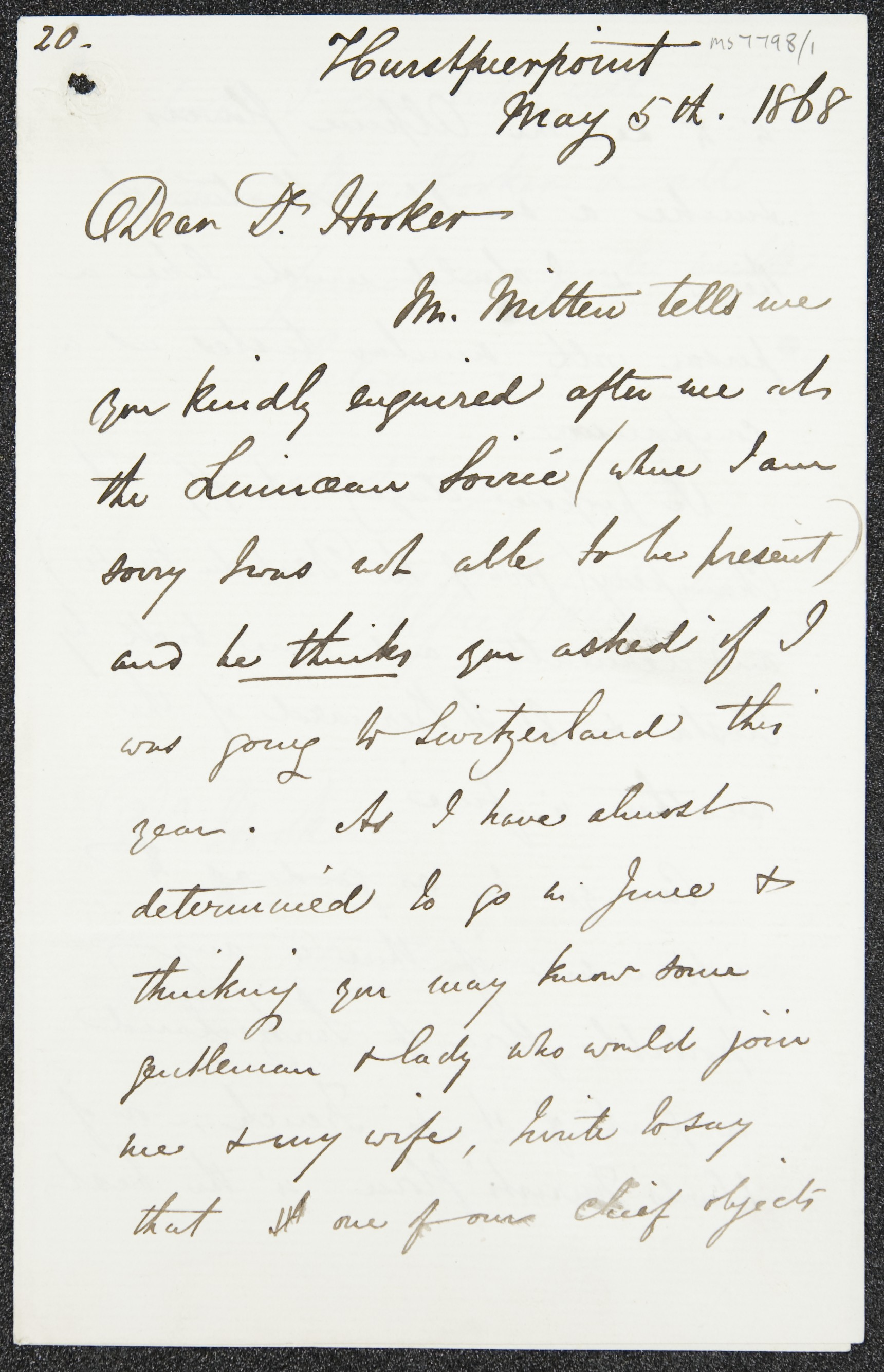
Letter to Sir Joseph Dalton Hooker from Wallace.

== Impact ==
The Wallace Correspondence Project is widely regarded as an important resource for the history of science. By assembling Wallace's letters and other manuscripts, the project provides a new primary resource for scholars of evolutionary biology, biogeography, and Victorian intellectual history. Historians note that an accessible archive of this kind not only aids current research but also attracts future scholarship – much as the earlier Darwin Correspondence Project did for Darwin studies.

The scholarly impact is already evident. The project's website notes that the unprecedented corpus of transcribed letters is proving "invaluable to Wallace scholars" and that these transcripts have been used extensively in recent research. For example, peer-reviewed articles and books on topics ranging from Wallace's Amazon voyage to his later writings on social issues such as eugenics, plus a major recent biography, have drawn on the archive's materials. In several recent publications, authors explicitly cite the transcripts by their catalogue numbers, a practice encouraged by the project.

More broadly, the Wallace Correspondence Project helps place Wallace's life in context. His correspondence illuminates 19th-century scientific networks (he corresponded with Darwin, Lyell, Bates, Hooker and many others) and cultural debates (such as land reform, spiritualism and eugenics). By digitizing and publishing these letters, the project ensures that Wallace's contributions are as accessible as those of better-known figures such as Charles Darwin. The archive has been praised as a "goldmine" of information, expanding our understanding of Wallace not just as a co‑discoverer of evolution, but as a wide-ranging scientist and public intellectual.
