= Walter Drawbridge Crick =

English businessman, amateur geologist and palaeontologist (1857-1903)

- Born: 1857
- Died: 1903 (aged 45–46)
- Occupation: Businessman

Walter Drawbridge Crick (15 December 1857, Hanslope, Buckinghamshire – 23 December 1903) was an English businessman, amateur geologist and palaeontologist.

The last publication by Charles Darwin in his lifetime was about the dispersal of freshwater bivalves, in which Darwin describes, and quotes, the observations of Mr. W. D. Crick of Northampton. Crick had first written to Darwin on 18 February 1882, and then wrote four more letters to Darwin up to 24 March 1882. Darwin wrote letters to Crick on 10 March 1882 and 26 March 1882. In the latter, Darwin mentions the letter he has written for publication in the journal Nature. These letters can be found in the Darwin Correspondence Project.

Born at Pinion End Farm, Hanslope, Crick went into business as a shoemaker, founding a company based at St Giles Street, Northampton that was inherited by his son Walter. W. D. Crick was the grandfather (by his son Harry) of Francis Crick, the molecular geneticist.

Crick was one of the correspondents of More Letters of Charles Darwin.

== See also ==
- List of paleontologists
