= Hen feathering =

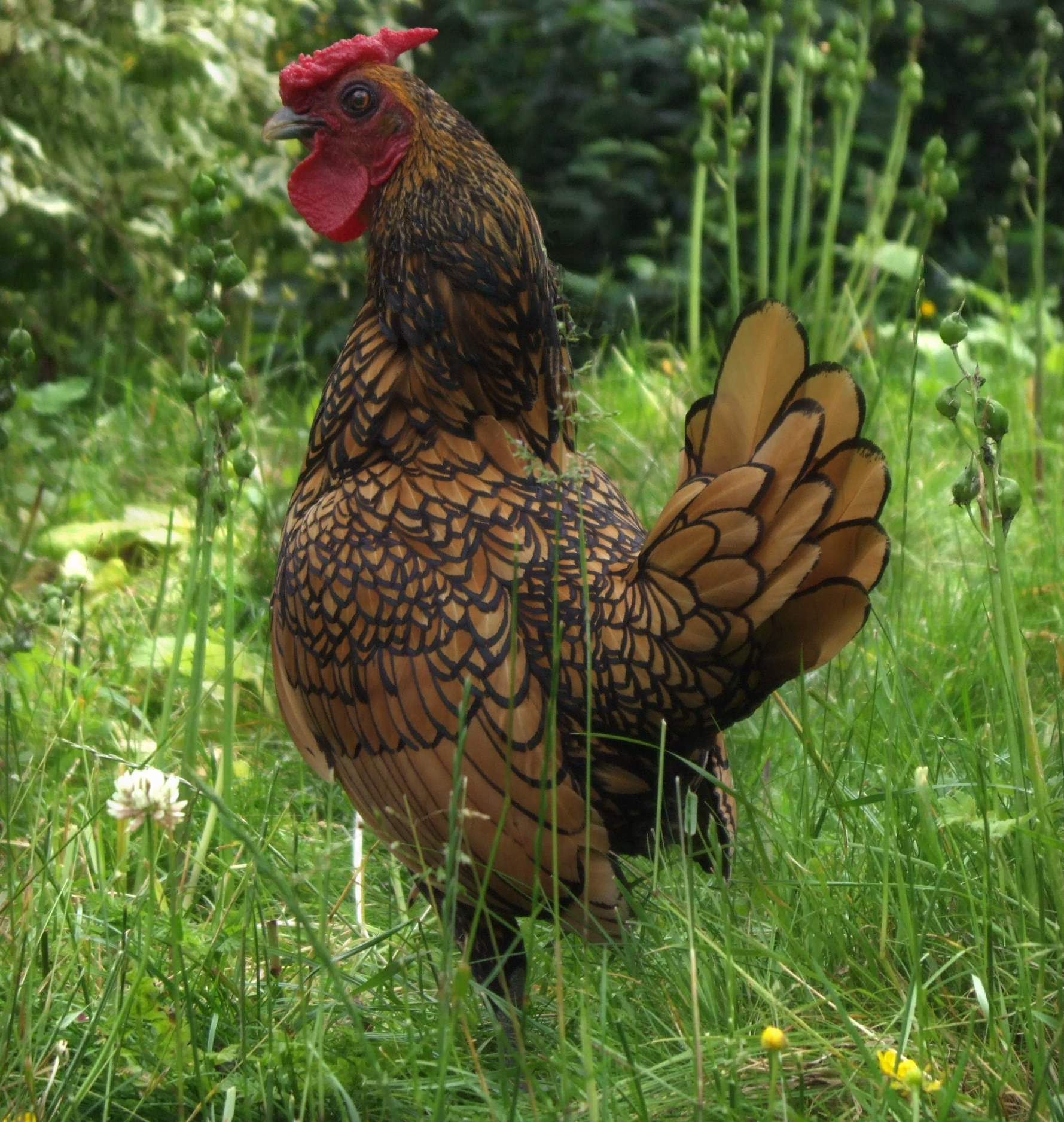
Golden Sebright cockerel showing hen-feathering

Hen feathering in cocks is the occurrence of a genetically conditioned character in domestic fowl (Gallus gallus domesticus). Males with this condition develop a female-type plumage, although otherwise look and respond as virile males.

Hen-feathering in cocks is one of the typical characteristics of the Sebright Bantam, a breed established circa 1810, in accordance with the intentions of its creator, Sir John Saunders Sebright.

Sexual dimorphism in plumage is very common in birds, particularly within Phasianidae where males are bigger and have brighter and more colorful plumage than females among other morphological differences.

== Cocks with hen-feathering ==
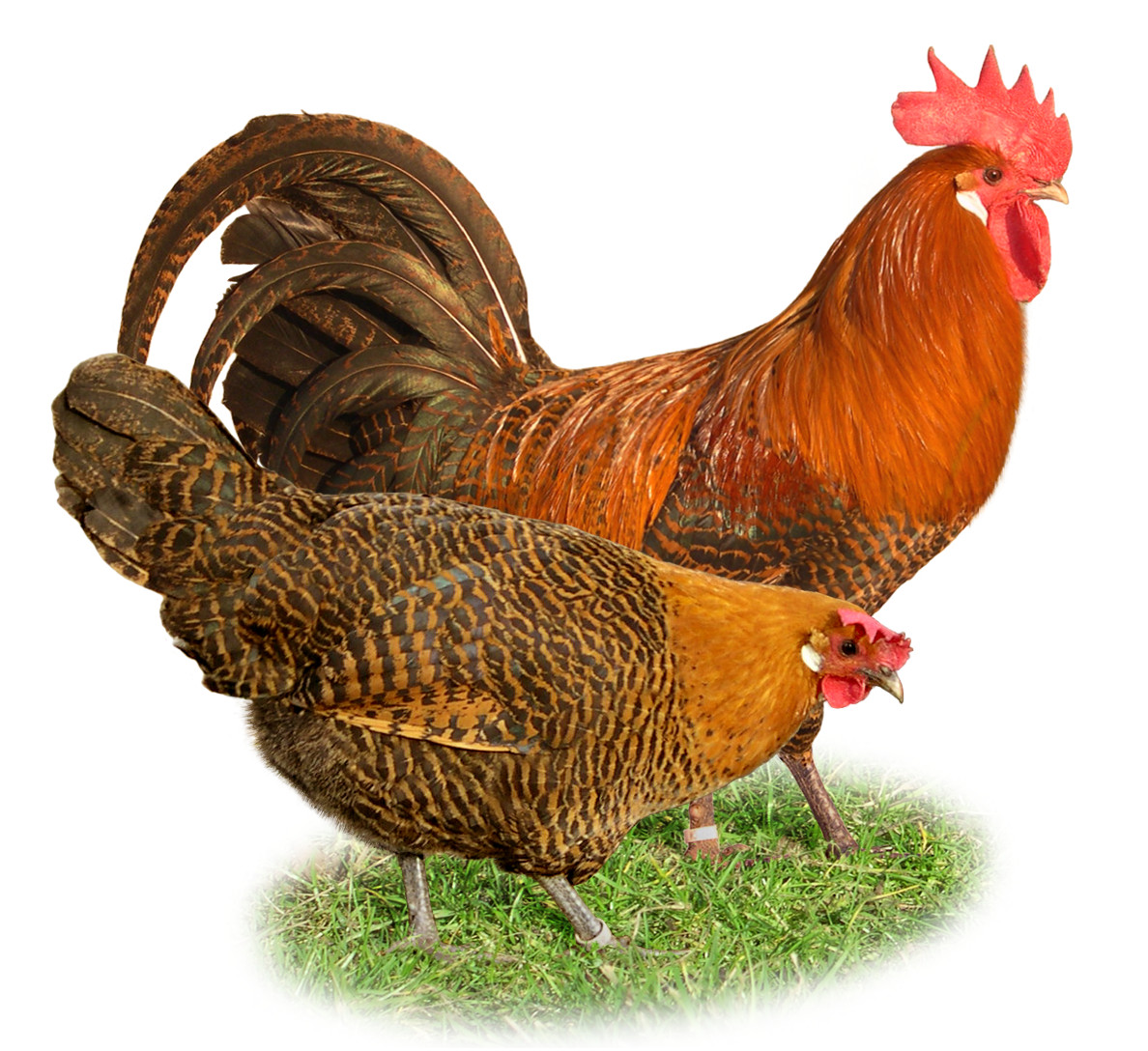
Males of most chicken breeds distinguish from their females

Males of most chicken breeds distinguish from their females in having longer, sharp and more scalloped feathers in neck, hackle, saddle and wing bows. But in some breeds, like the fancy breeds Sebright and Campine and some game breeds like Pettai Madhirione can see males that have a plumage completely similar in all aspects to that of females. This unusual type of feathering called so much the interest of biologists that was studied from different points of view, and as a consequence, the inheritance of this condition has been well understood, while the biochemical basis determining this condition is still under study.

== Mode of inheritance ==
It had been early established that hen-feathering is a trait controlled by a simple autosomic dominant gene, whose expression is limited to the male sex.

The genetic symbol proposed by F. B. Hutt in 1958 to designate this autosomic dominant gene was Hf (after "hen feathering") which was accepted by other geneticists. Both homozygous Hf/Hf and heterozygous Hf/hf males are of the hen-feathering type, while hf/hf are of the normal feathering type. Meanwhile, female carriers of Hf gene can not be identified unless they are submitted to progeny tests.

Attempts to demonstrate genetic linkage to several known loci have been unsuccessful.

== Expressiveness of hen-feathering in cocks ==
Hen-feathering in heterozygous Hf/hf males is sometimes difficult to identify because some of those males may show only a few female feathers in their first adult plumage. But those males reach a complete female plumage after the first moult when they acquire the adult plumage of the second year. This happens because hen-feathering requires a masculine hormone and in some cases first adult plumage is completed before testicles work normally. Sometimes, well characterized old males of the hen-feathering type can turn, with age, into normal male plumage due to a subnormal testicular activity.

These variations in the expression of the character, even within the same individual, defies common sense and may confuse non-advised breeders who might expect a better mating behaviour in normal male-feathering cocks than in those of the hen-feathering type. Some Sebright breeders consider hen-feathering to have adverse effect on the fertility of the male and may use cocks that do not carry the trait for breeding purposes, despite their automatic disqualification in shows.

== Hormonal dependence of hen-feathering ==
Hen-feathering in cocks does not manifest itself unless the feathers are developed under the influx of sexual hormones. The effect on feathering is just the same both whether the hormone comes from the own testicles of the male or from an injection of testosterone.

Chickens of both sexes develop male-type plumage after gonadectomization. Strictly speaking, they develop a neutral plumage with long acute feathers, like those of male plumage, because ovarian hormone is also necessary to develop female plumage.

It is well known that some of the main estrogens derive from androgens. Androstenedione transforms into estrone, while testosterone transforms into estradiol through the action of the enzyme aromatase. So this enzyme plays an important role in the biosynthesis of estrogens.

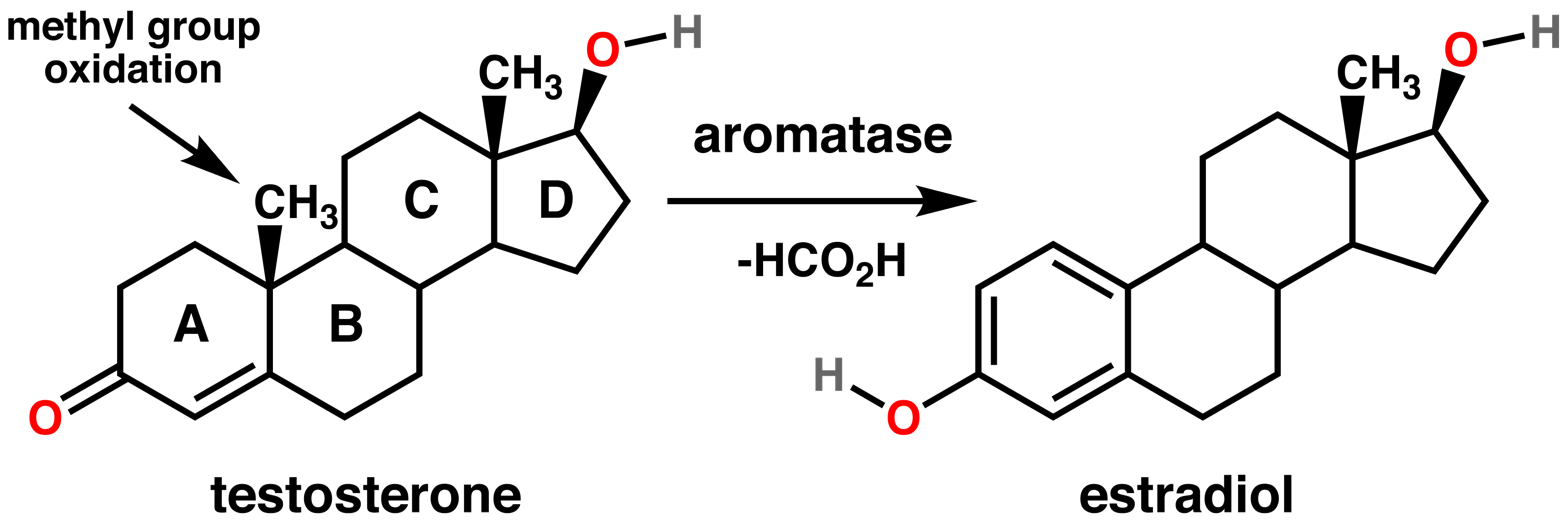
Testosterone is normally converted to estradiol, one of the main estrogens, through the action of the enzyme aromatase.

== Enhanced aromatase activity in the skin ==
Skin of adult chickens carrying Hf has increased levels of estrogens. When skin grafts taken from females carrying Hf gene, are put on normal males, the skin of the grafts develop female (shorter and rounded tip) feathers. If the hosts of the grafts are subsequently castrated, all the feathers, including that of the skin graft turned into the male-type.

In female chickens of all breeds development of female feathering pattern is mediated by estrogens. In normal hf/hf individuals rates of estrogen formation are undetectable or low in all control tissues other than ovary. Conversely rate of estrogen formation is high in skin and skin appendages and detectable in many other tissues biopsied from mature Hf/Hf or Hf/hf birds. The henny-feathering trait in males is the result of increased conversion of androgen to estrogen in skin.

Increased estrogen formation in the skin and other peripheral tissues of chickens with the henny-feathering trait is due to an enhanced activity of the aromatase complex of enzymes responsible for estrogen synthesis. Estrogen formation is as much as several hundred-fold higher in fibroblasts cultured from skin of chickens carrying the henny feathering trait compared to that observed in fibroblasts from skin of control chickens.

The average rate of aromatase activity, measured using a sensitive isotopic assay, in the skin of heterozygous Hf/hf chicks is approximately half that of homozygous Hf/Hf henny chicks. But half maximal level of the enzyme is sufficient to allow full development of female feathering in affected male birds and this explains why hen-feathering in heterozygous Hf/hf males is sometimes difficult to identify in their first adult plumage: See Expressiveness.... In normal hf/hf birds the activity of the enzyme is limited in all tissues other than ovary.

== Aromatase excess syndrome in humans ==
There is a curious resemblance of the increased aromatase activity in chickens, to the aromatase excess syndrome in humans, a rather rare syndrome that can lead to gynecomastia in boys, and to precocious puberty and gigantomastia in girls, and which is also inherited in an autosomal dominant fashion.

== See also ==
- Aromatase
- Aromatase excess syndrome
