= James Torbitt =

James Torbitt (c. 1823 – 29 June 1895) was an Irish spirit merchant based in Belfast notable for his correspondence with Charles Darwin.

Starting in 1878, Torbitt exchanged several letters with Darwin regarding the artificial breeding of potato plants that were resistant to the potato blight that devastated Ireland in the Great Famine. Darwin also discussed this with Hooker, and others. Darwin was impressed with Torbitt's plan to breed potatoes from the occasional potatoes that managed to survive an attack of blight. Darwin wrote over 40 letters to his correspondents about Torbitt's ideas and he tried to find Torbitt funding. Torbitt and Darwin exchanged over 90 pieces of correspondence. One of the postcards sent by Darwin to Torbitt in 1880 was auctioned for over £3,500 in 2016.

He died in Belfast at age 72.
