= Grace Prestwich =

Scottish author and illustrator

Lady Grace Prestwich
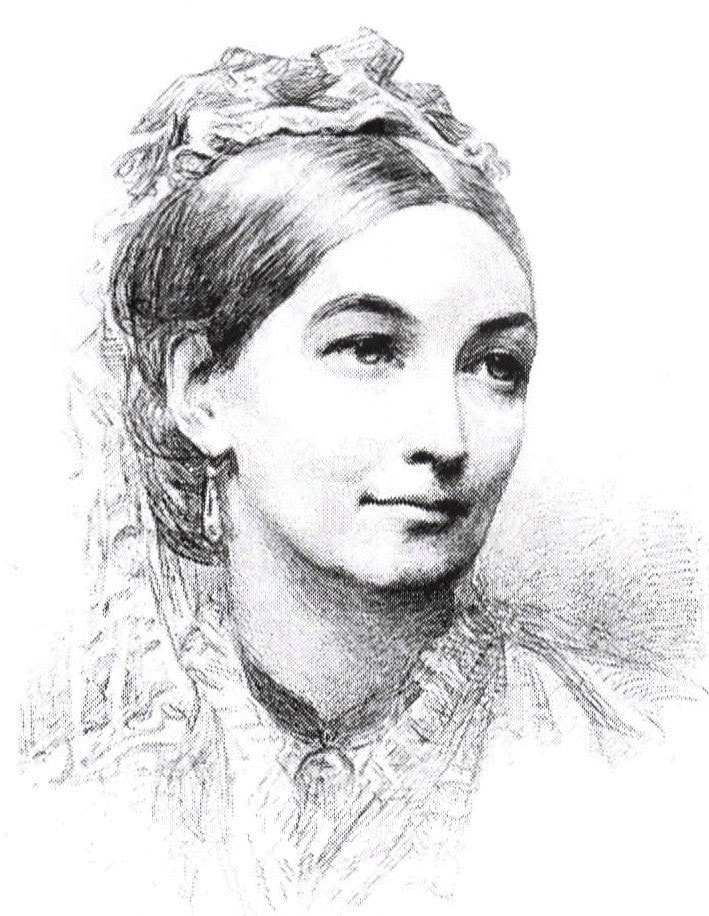
- Pencil drawing of Grace Prestwich from 1876
- Born: Grace Anne Milne; 19 December 1832; Kinloss, Scotland
- Died: 31 August 1899 (aged 66)
- Other names: Grace McCall
- Occupations: Author and illustrator
- Spouses: George McCall; Sir Joseph Prestwich
- Relatives: Dr Hugh Falconer (uncle)

Grace, Lady Prestwich (née Grace Anne Milne; 19 December 1832 – 31 August 1899), was a Scottish author and illustrator. She wrote fiction and popularizations of geology.

== Life and works ==
Born Grace Anne Milne in Kinloss, Scotland, on 19 December 1832. Botanist and paleontologist Hugh Falconer was her uncle and they corresponded extensively. She was sent away to boarding school at age six and was a good student. She learned to draw portraits during this time. She married the wine merchant George McCall on 18 October 1854 and gave him a son the following year. Her husband died from pneumonia in March 1856 and her son from hydrocephaly two months later. Shortly afterward, she took care of her uncle, Alexander Falconer, during his last days. Alexander's brother, her uncle Hugh Falconer, invited her along on a long tour of Italy and France in September 1858, during which they met his friend, the science writer Mary Somerville, and she became his assistant, secretary and hostess until his death in 1865. During her travels with Hugh Falconer, "Grace collected fossils at several localities, drew museum specimens, and copied cross-sections" for her uncle, "learning all the while". She married the much older wine merchant and geologist, Sir Joseph Prestwich, on 6 February 1870; they had no children.

Prestwich began writing during the 1870s, publishing two anonymous novels and a series of articles explaining geology in Every Girl's Magazine and Good Words. In these articles, she laid out the history of geology and discussed the evidence for and against various hypotheses. She also wrote popular versions of at least two of her husband's scientific papers for Good Words. Prestwich later wrote several accounts of her travels with her uncle for other magazines. She became an active member of the council of one of the first two women's colleges at the University of Oxford: Somerville Hall (later Somerville College), established in 1879 and named after Mary Somerville.

Grace Prestwich died on 31 August 1899 after several years of ill-health. Under Falconer's tutelage and as a result of her own expertise and intellect, she had become a geologist in her own right at a time when women were still denied access to academic education and degrees. The president of the Geological Society in London recorded on her death that only her female sex had precluded Grace Prestwich from being elected Fellow. After her death, her sister, Louisa E. Milne, published a collection of Grace's essays.
