= Mary Settegast =

Mary Settegast (May 27, 1934 – August 24, 2020) was a contemporary American scholar and author who specialized in the Neolithic Age.

Settegast earned graduate degrees from the University of California, Berkeley and Columbia University. She received critical praise for her books Plato Prehistorian, Mona Lisa's Moustache, When Zarathustra Spoke, and The Bear, the Bull, and the Child of Light. As their titles indicate, Settegast's first and third books focus on human prehistory; her special interest was on the co-evolution of religion and agriculture. In a different vein, Mona Lisa's Moustache deals with contemporary cultural and intellectual issues. Her fourth and final book, a novel set during the prehistoric period covered in her earlier works, imagines the journey of a hunter-forager child who is taken to live as a slave among the obsidian masters in Çatalhöyük during the time of the emergence of agriculture around the Mediterranean.

== Plato Prehistorian ==
In her book Plato Prehistorian (1986, 2nd edition 1990) Settegast argues Plato's dialogues Timaeus and Critias are partially reliable sources of oral tradition that contain memories that extend as far back to the Paleolithic cultures of Western Europe and Neolithic Çatalhöyük. As a cautious scholar, she doesn't seek to identify Atlantis as a real place, and questions the existence of the island, but instead identifies the culture on Atlantis described by Plato with Magdalenian culture (17,000 – 12,000 BP) of the Lascaux cave art.

In 1992, a fairly negative review of the book was published in the classics journal Ancient Philosophy. It is pointed out Settegast's book is unusual and that the consensus among classicists is Plato's dialogues about Atlantis don't contain a kernel of historical truth and are fiction. On the other hand, the back-cover of Plato Prehistorian (2nd ed. Lindisfarne Press, 1990) quotes positive reviews by academics, including William Irwin Thompson: "A highly original and completely fascinating look at the shore between myth and history."

== Bibliography (books) ==
- Plato Prehistorian: 10,000 to 5000 B.C. in Myth and Archaeology, Cambridge, MA, Rotenberg Press, 1986. ISBN 978-0-9617333-1-5
- Mona Lisa's Moustache: Making Sense of a Dissolving World, Grand Rapids, MI, Phanes Press, 2001. ISBN 978-1-890482-91-6
- When Zarathustra Spoke: The Reformation of Neolithic Culture and Religion, Costa Mesa, CA, Mazda Publishers, 2005. ISBN 978-1-56859-184-1
- The Bear, the Bull, and the Child of Light: A Prehistoric Novel, Boulder, CO, Rotenberg Press, 2018. ISBN 978-1-7324122-0-0
