= James Moore (biographer) =

Author of biographies of Charles Darwin (born 1947)

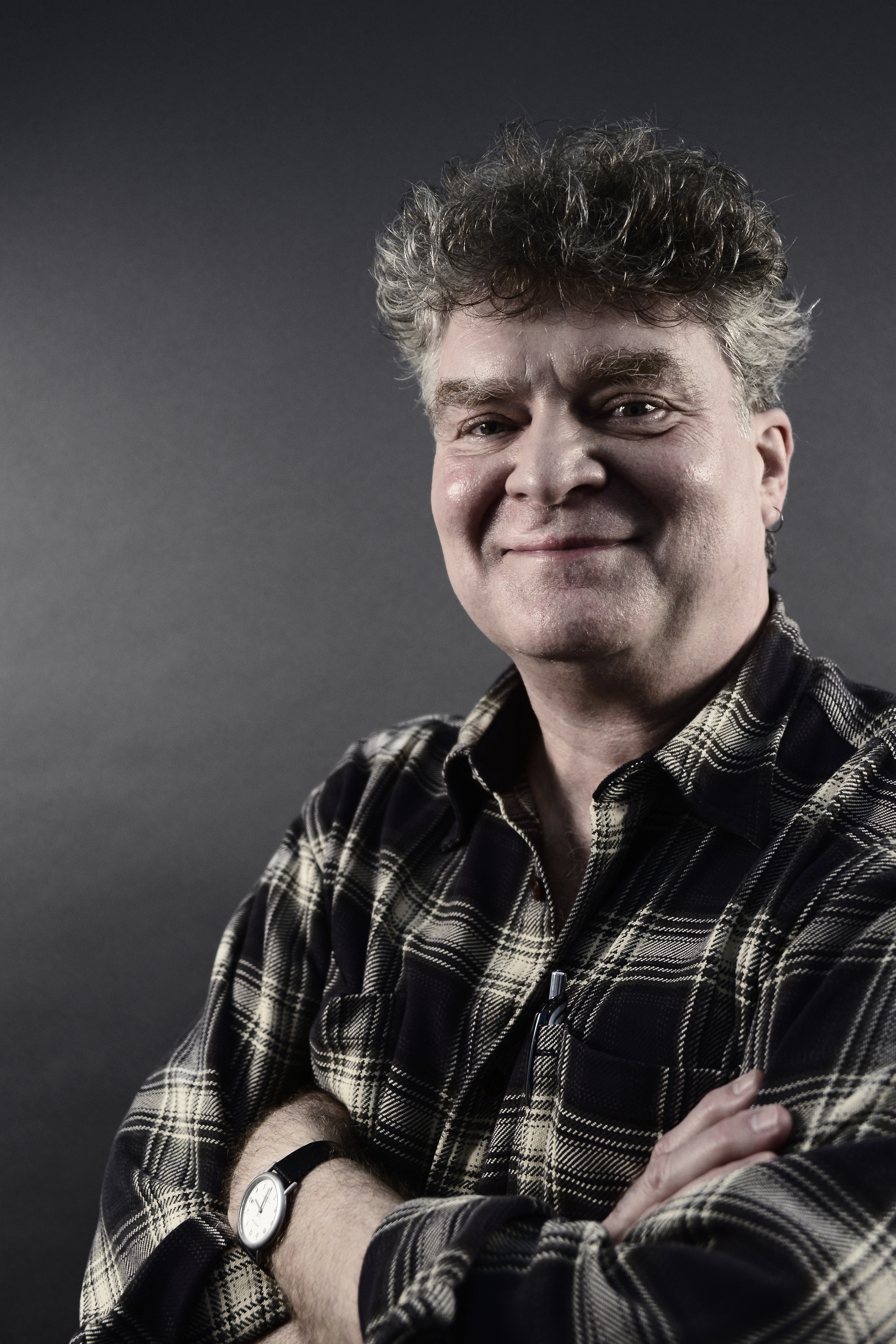
James Moore

James Richard Moore is a historian of science at the Open University and the University of Cambridge and a visiting scholar at Harvard University. He is the author of several biographies of Charles Darwin. As a Cambridge research scholar and a member of the teaching staff at the Open University, he has studied and written about Darwin since the 1970s, co-authoring with Adrian Desmond the major biography Darwin, and also writing The Darwin Legend, The Post-Darwinian Controversies, and many articles and reviews.

== Publications ==
- James Moore. (1979). The Post-Darwinian Controversies: A Study of the Protestant Struggle to Come to Terms with Darwin in Great Britain and America, 1870-1900, Cambridge University Press
- Adrian Desmond; James Moore (1991), Darwin, Michael Joseph, Penguin Books
- Adrian Desmond, James Moore & Janet Browne (2007), Charles Darwin, Oxford and New York: Oxford University Press, ISBN 978-0-19-921354-2
- Adrian Desmond; James Moore (2009), Darwin's Sacred Cause, Allen Lane, Penguin
