= Adrian Desmond =

English science writer (born 1947)

Adrian John Desmond (born 1947) is an English writer on the history of science and author of books about Charles Darwin.

== Life ==
He studied physiology at London University and went on to study the history of science and vertebrate palaeontology at University College London before researching the history of vertebrate palaeontology at Harvard University. He was awarded a PhD in the area of the Victorian-period context of Darwinian evolution.

Desmond is an Honorary Research Fellow in the Biology Department at University College London.

== Books ==
- The Hot-blooded Dinosaurs: a revolution in palaeontology (1975)
- The Ape's Reflexion (1979)
- Archetypes and Ancestors: Palaeontology in Victorian London 1850-1875 (1982)
- The Politics of Evolution: Morphology, medicine and reform in radical London (1989). This work won the Pfizer Award.
- Darwin (1991) with James Moore. This work won the James Tait Black Prize, the Comisso Prize for biography in Italy, the Watson Davis Prize of the History of Science Society and the Dingle Prize of the British Society for the History of Science.
- Huxley: From Devil's Disciple to Evolution's High Priest (1999)
- Charles Darwin (Very Interesting People) with Janet Browne & James Moore (2007)
- Darwin's Sacred Cause: Race, Slavery, and the Quest for Human Origins with James Moore (2009)
