= Daniel Mackintosh =

Scottish geomorphologist and ethnologist

Daniel Mackintosh FGS (1815 - 19 July 1891) was a Scottish geomorphologist and ethnologist. He was a correspondent with Charles Darwin.
