= Correspondence of Charles Darwin =

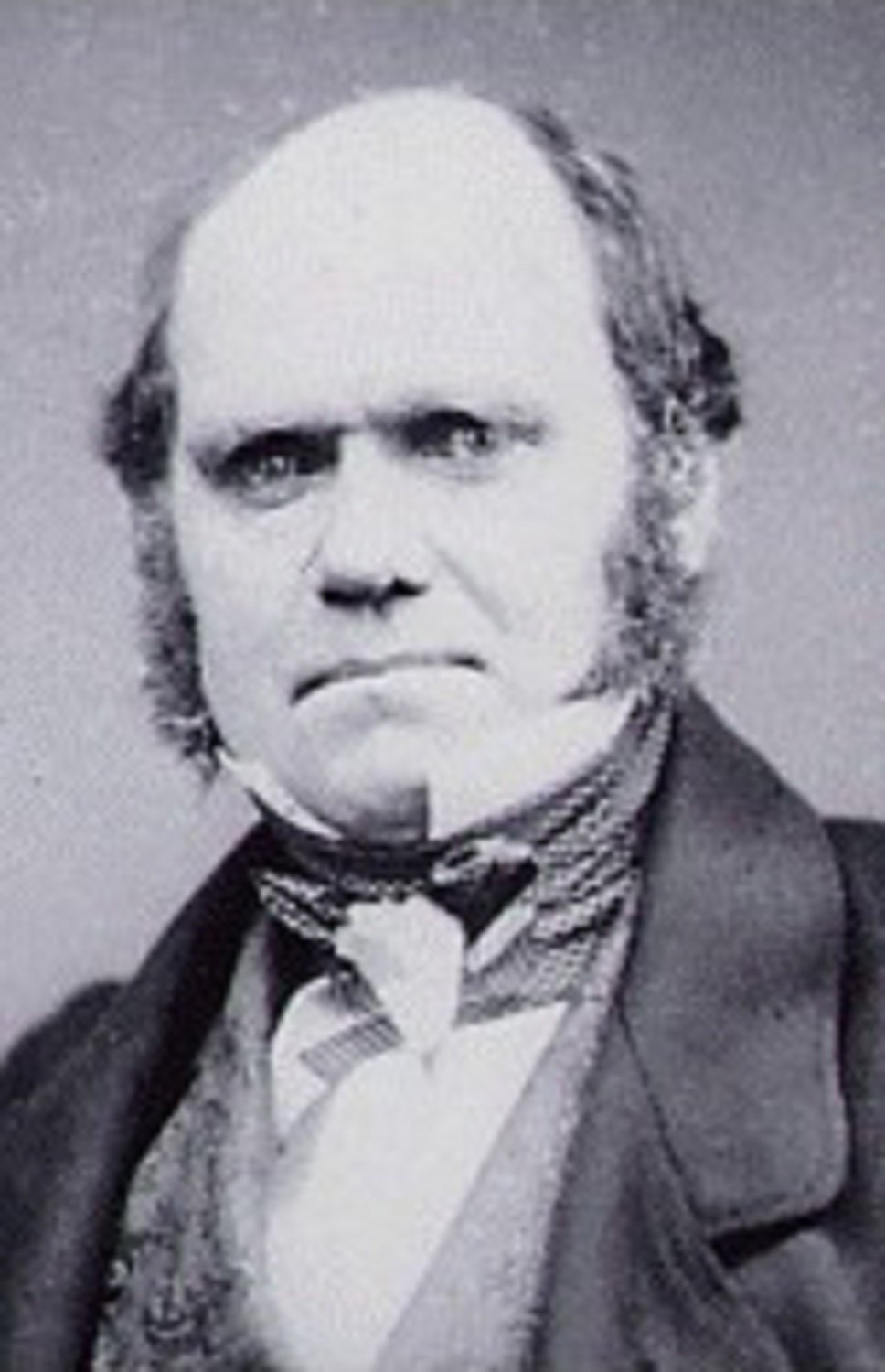
Charles Darwin in 1854

The British naturalist Charles Darwin corresponded with his extended family and with an extraordinarily wide range of people from all over the world. The letters, over 15,000 in all, provide many insights on issues ranging from the origins of key scientific concepts, to religious and philosophical discussions which have continued to the present day. The letters also illuminate many aspects of Darwin and his biography: the development of his ideas; insights into character and health; and private opinions on controversial issues. His letters to the Harvard botanist Asa Gray, for example, show his opinions on slavery and the American Civil War. Darwin relied upon correspondence for much of his scientific work, and also used letters to marshal support for his ideas amongst friends and colleagues. The historian of science Janet Browne has argued that Darwin's ability to correspond daily played a crucial role in the development of his theory and his ability to garner support for it from colleagues.

== History ==
Correspondence was central to science in the Victorian era. In his early years, most of the letters Darwin filed away were directly relevant to one of his ongoing scientific projects in geology, invertebrate zoology, and other fields. Most letters, however, were stuck onto "spits", as Darwin called them, and when his slender stock of these was exhausted, he would burn the letters of several years, in order that he might make use of the liberated "spits." This process, carried on for years, destroyed many of the letters received before 1861. Even so, the number of letters, even in these early years, is remarkable. After publication of the Origin of Species in 1859, Darwin's children convinced him to save a far greater proportion of his correspondence, so that the sequence from the early 1860s onwards is remarkably full.

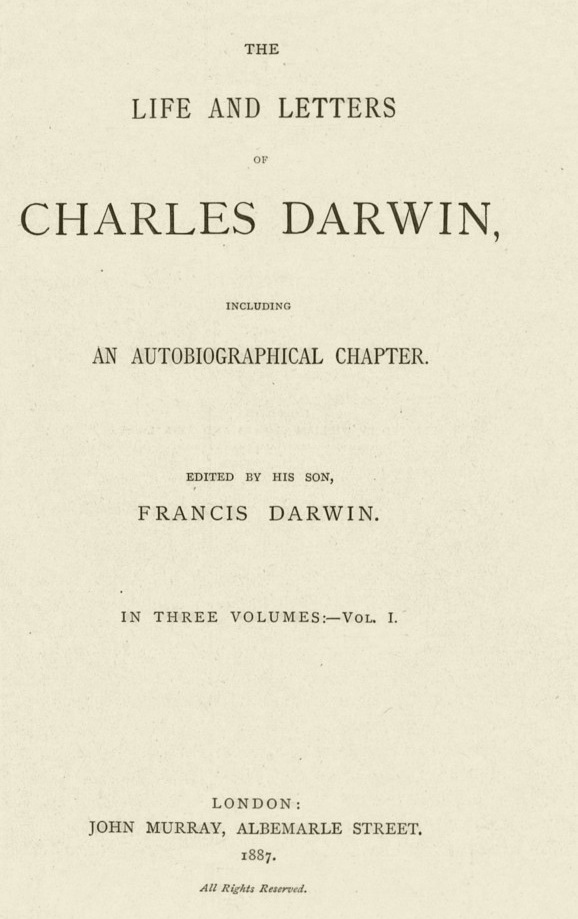
Photocopied title page of the original edition of Charles Darwin's autobiography.

In 1887, five years after Darwin's death, Darwin's son Francis Darwin published The Life and Letters of Charles Darwin in three volumes, to accompany the publication of The Autobiography of Charles Darwin. This was later followed by two volumes of More Letters of Charles Darwin published in 1902. For over a century these volumes were the main source for Darwin's correspondence, although they contain only a small proportion of the available total, and many are abridged.

In 1974 the Darwin Correspondence Project was founded at the University of Cambridge by the American philosopher and academic administrator Frederick Burkhardt, with the aid of the Cambridge zoologist and historian Sydney Smith. Cambridge University owns 9,000 letters and has obtained copies of over 6,000 additional letters held in other collections. New letters are constantly being discovered and photocopies of new finds should be sent to the Manuscripts Department of Cambridge University Library, which can help identify correspondents and provide accurate dating. The complete edition of the correspondence in 30 volumes is available from Cambridge University Press, with the content freely available online. Every volume includes a substantial introduction, and the letters are edited to the highest editorial standard. The Darwin Correspondence website also includes extensive additional materials, including resources for school and university teaching.

Prior to its completion in December 2022, the Darwin Correspondence was among the most substantial editing projects in the English-speaking world, with a full- and part-time staff of eleven.

== List of notable persons with whom Darwin corresponded ==
Entries marked with asterisks denote persons for which 100 letters or more have been located. All of these letters can be found on the Darwin Correspondence Project website.

- Louis Agassiz
- Alexander Bain
- Henry Walter Bates
- Lydia Becker
- George Bentham
- Charles Harrison Blackley
- Antoinette Brown Blackwell
- Mary Boole
- Heinrich Georg Bronn
- John Burdon-Sanderson
- Alphonse Louis Pierre Pyrame de Candolle
- William Benjamin Carpenter
- Frances Power Cobbe
- Walter Drawbridge Crick, grandfather of Francis Crick
- Thomas Davidson
- Anton Dohrn
- Franciscus Donders
- George Eliot
- Hugh Falconer
- Frederic William Farrar
- Thomas Farrer, 1st Baron Farrer
- John Fiske
- Robert FitzRoy
- Auguste-Henri Forel
- Johan Georg Forchhammer
- Francis Galton*
- Jean Albert Gaudry
- James Geikie
- Joseph Henry Gilbert
- Philip Henry Gosse
- Asa Gray*
- William Robert Grove
- Julius von Haast
- Ernst Haeckel
- John Stevens Henslow*
- Joseph Dalton Hooker*
- Thomas Henry Huxley*
- Thomas Jamieson
- Leonard Jenyns
- Charles Kingsley
- James Lamont
- Ray Lankester
- John Lubbock*
- Charles Lyell*
- Maxwell T. Masters
- Patrick Matthew
- Charles Johnson Maynard
- Edward S. Morse
- Henry Nottidge Moseley
- Fritz Müller
- John Murray
- Melchior Neumayr
- Alfred Newton
- Richard Owen
- Jean Louis Armand de Quatrefages de Bréau
- George Croom Robertson
- George Romanes
- Sir John Sebright
- Adam Sedgwick
- Frederick Smith
- Herbert Spencer
- Japetus Steenstrup
- Bartholomew Sulivan
- Mary Lua Adelia Davis Treat
- Alfred Russel Wallace
- Julia Wedgwood
- August Weismann
- William Whewell
- William Winwood Reade
- Chauncey Wright
