= Joseph Prestwich =

British geologist and businessman

Sir Joseph Prestwich
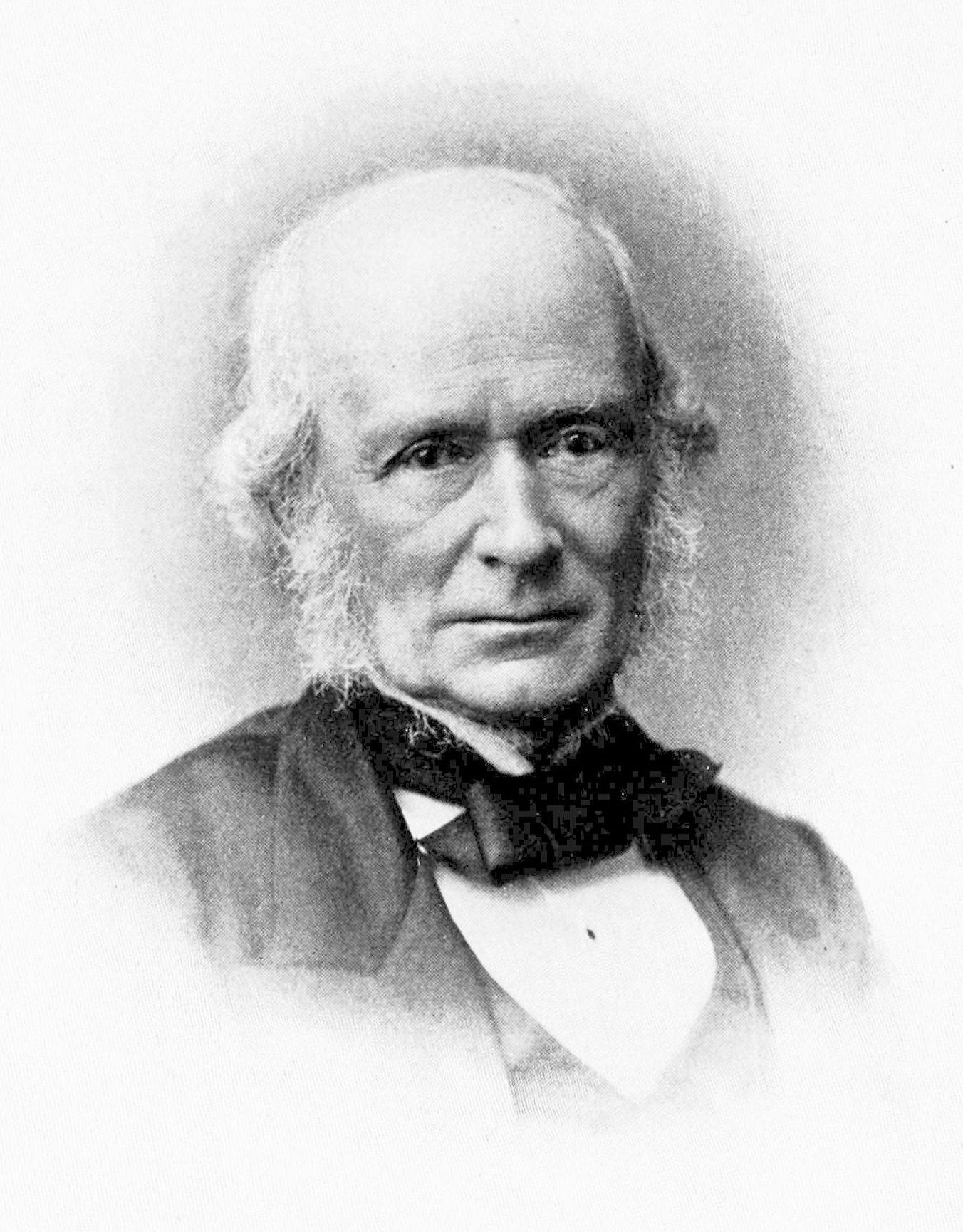
- Portrait of Prestwich published in The Popular Science Monthly
- Born: 12 March 1812; Clapham
- Died: 23 June 1896 (aged 84)
- Spouse(s): Lady Grace Prestwich (formerly McCall; née Milne; married 1870)
- Awards: Wollaston Medal (1849); Royal Medal (1865)

Sir Joseph Prestwich FRS FGS (12 March 1812 – 23 June 1896) was a British geologist and businessman, known as an expert on the Tertiary Period and for having confirmed the findings of Boucher de Perthes of ancient flint tools in the Somme valley gravel beds.

== Biography ==
Born in Clapham, Prestwich was educated in Paris and Reading before entering University College, London where he studied chemistry and natural philosophy. Whilst a student he founded the short-lived Zetetical Society. In 1830, he began working for the family wine business. This job required him to travel throughout the United Kingdom and also abroad to France and Belgium, and during the course of these travels he made many geological observations. He became a Fellow of Geological Society in 1833 and published his first paper there two years later. His 1836 memoir on the Geology of Coalbrookdale, based upon observations made during 1831 and 1832, established his reputation as a geologist.

From 1846, his attention focused upon the Tertiary deposits of the London Basin, which he subsequently classified and then correlated with Tertiary deposits throughout England, France and Belgium. In 1858, Prestwich was persuaded by Hugh Falconer to visit Abbeville, where Boucher de Perthes had claimed to have found flint tools in the gravel deposits of the valley of the Somme, thus establishing the antiquity of man. In company with Sir John Evans, Prestwich visited the gravel beds of St Acheul and confirmed the observations of Boucher de Perthes. Prestwich's report on the matter was published in the Proceedings of the Royal Society for 1859–1860: It is claimed by some authorities that this publication marks the birth of modern scientific archaeology.

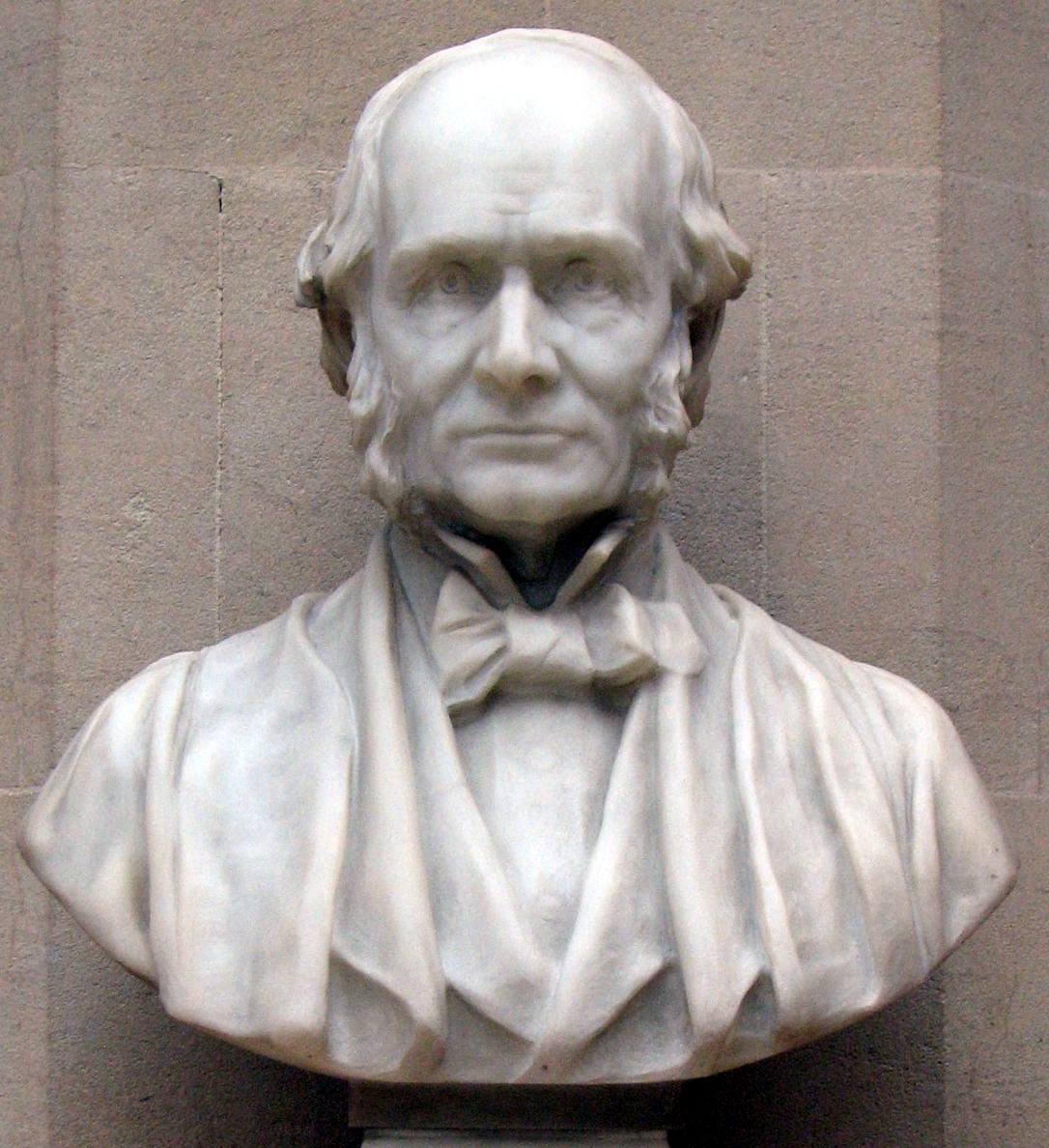
Bust on display in the Oxford University Museum

During the late 1860s, Prestwich served on the Royal Coal Commission and the Royal Commission on the Metropolitan Water Supply. In 1870–72, he was president of the Geological Society. In 1874, he was appointed to the chair of geology at the University of Oxford. Here he produced in two volumes Geology, Chemical and Physical, Stratigraphical and Palaeontological. In 1888, he retired from Oxford to Shoreham, Kent where he continued to work until his death in 1896. Prestwich was elected a Fellow of the Royal Society in 1853, awarded its Royal Medal in 1865, awarded a Telford Medal for a paper entitled "On the Geological Conditions affecting the Construction of a Tunnel between England and France", in 1873.

He was elected to honorary membership of the Manchester Literary and Philosophical Society, in 1866, as a member of the American Philosophical Society in 1869. Knighted in 1896. He married Grace Anne McCall, the niece of Hugh Falconer, in 1870.
