= Hermann Settegast =

German agronomist

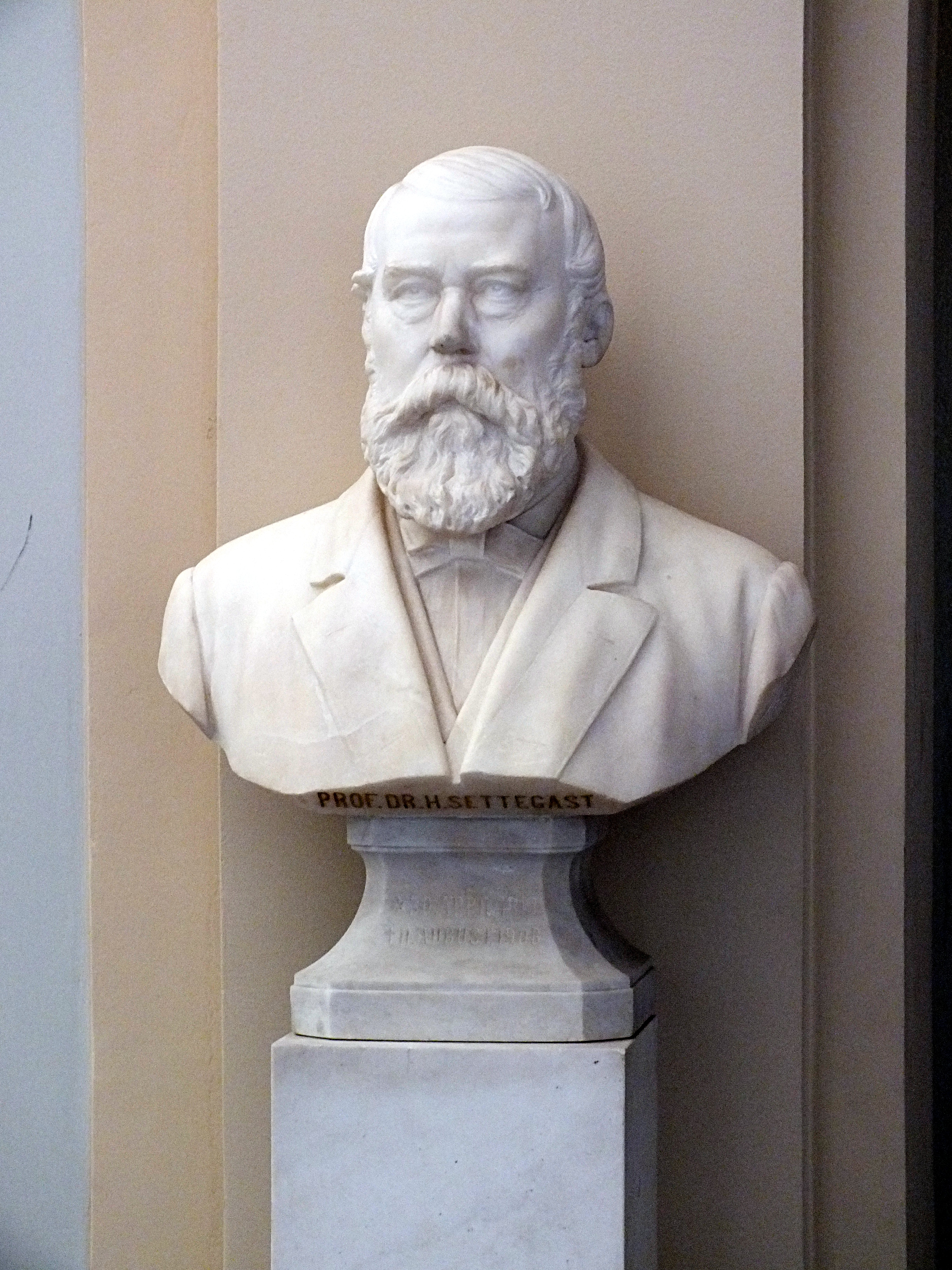
Bust of Settegast at Humboldt University, Berlin

Hermann Gustav Settegast (30 April 1819 in Königsberg - 11 August 1908 in Berlin) was a German agronomist. He established the first agricultural school in Germany that was independent of a university and is considered to be one of the 19th century's foremost experts on animal breeding.
