= Janet Browne =

British historian of science (born 1950)

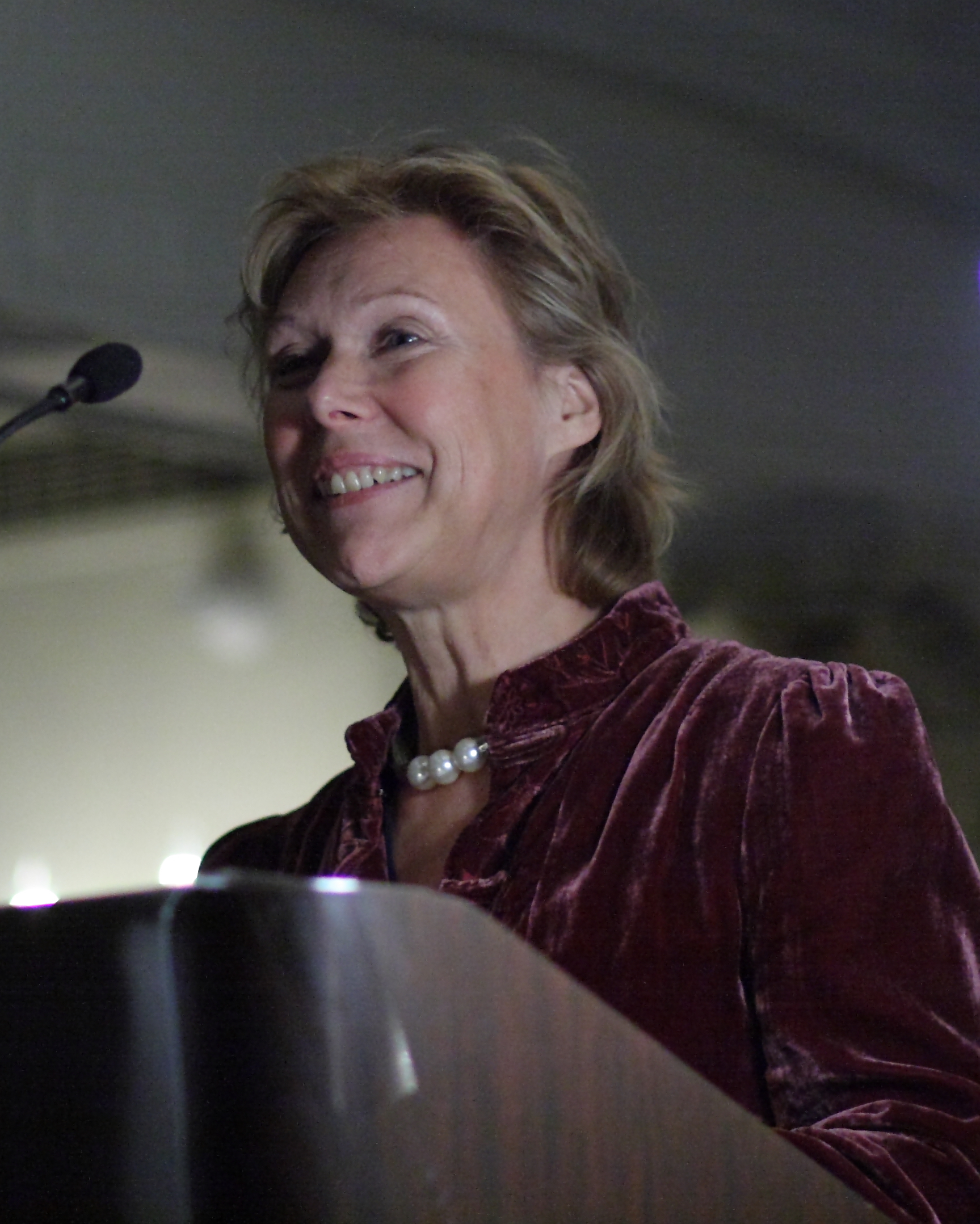
- English: Historian of science Janet Browne, introducing Steven Shapin before his Distinguished Lecture at the 2008 History of Science Society meeting
- Born: 30 March 1950 (age 76)
- Education: Trinity College, Dublin; Imperial College, London
- Scientific career
- Fields: Historian of Science
- Workplaces: Harvard

Elizabeth Janet Browne (née Bell; born 30 March 1950) is a British historian of science, known especially for her work on the history of 19th-century biology. She taught at the Wellcome Trust Centre for the History of Medicine, University College, London, before returning to Harvard. She is currently Aramont Professor of the History of Science at Harvard University.

== Biography ==
Browne is the daughter of Douglas Bell CBE (1905–1993) and his wife Betty Bell. She married Nicholas Browne in 1972; they have two daughters.

Browne gained a BA degree from Trinity College, Dublin in 1972 and from Imperial College, London an MSc (1973) and PhD (1978) on the history of science. She was a research fellow at Harvard University. She received an honorary Doctor in Science (Sc. D) degree from Trinity College, Dublin in 2009 in recognition of her contribution to the biographical knowledge of Charles Darwin.

After working as an associate editor on the University of Cambridge Library project to collect, edit, and publish the correspondence of Charles Darwin, she wrote a two-volume biography of the naturalist: Charles Darwin: Voyaging (1995), on his youth and years on the Beagle, and Charles Darwin: The Power of Place (2002), covering the years after the publication of his theory of evolution. The latter book has received acclaim for its innovative interpretation of the role of Darwin's correspondence in the formation of his scientific theory and recruitment of scientific support. In 2004, this volume won the History of Science Society's Pfizer Award, the Society's highest honor awarded to individual works of scholarship. In 2003, it also won the James Tait Black Memorial Prize for Biography. In 2020 she was admitted as a member of the Royal Irish Academy.

Browne currently serves as the Aramont Professor in the History of Science at Harvard University. She specializes in life sciences, natural history, and evolutionary biology from the 17th to the 20th century.

== Publications ==
The following is a selection of Browne's publications, chosen primarily by convenience from internet searches, but also to indicate the timespan over which she has published.

- Browne, Janet (1978). "The Charles Darwin - Joseph Hooker correspondence: an analysis of manuscript resources and their use in biography". Journal of the Society for the Bibliography of Natural History. 8 (4): 351–366. doi:10.3366/jsbnh.1978.8.part_4.351.
- Browne, Janet (March 1980). "Darwin's botanical arithmetic and the "principle of divergence," 1854–1858". Journal of the History of Biology. 13 (1): 53–89. doi:10.1007/BF00125354. PMID 11610734. S2CID 5801204.
- Browne, Janet (December 1989). "Botany for Gentlemen: Erasmus Darwin and "The Loves of the Plants"" (PDF). Isis. 80 (4): 593–621. doi:10.1086/355166. JSTOR 234174. S2CID 53599751.
- Browne, Janet (1990). "Spas and Sensibilities: Darwin at Malvern". Medical History. Supplement No.10 (10): 102–113. doi:10.1017/s0025727300071027. PMC 2557456. PMID 11622586.
- Browne, Janet (1992). "A science of empire: British biogeography before Darwin". Revue d'histoire des sciences. 45 (4): 453–475. doi:10.3406/rhs.1992.4244.
- Browne, Janet (1995). Charles Darwin: vol. 1 Voyaging. London: Jonathan Cape. ISBN 1-84413-314-1.
- Browne, Janet (1996). Charles Darwin: Voyaging. Princeton, New Jersey: Princeton University Press. ISBN 978-0-691-02606-0.
- Browne, Janet (December 2001). "Darwin in Caricature: A Study in the Popularisation and Disseminatin of Evolution". Proceedings of the American Philosophical Society. 145 (4): 496–509. JSTOR 1558189. Full article
- Browne, Janet (2002). Charles Darwin: vol. 2 The Power of Place. London: Jonathan Cape. ISBN 0-7126-6837-3.
- Browne, Janet (2003). "Charles Darwin as a Celebrity". Science in Context. 16 (1–2): 175–194. doi:10.1017/S0269889703000772. S2CID 145301604.
- Browne, Janet (2006). Darwin's Origin of Species: A Biography. Crows Nest NSW, Australia: Allen & Unwin. ISBN 978-1-74114-784-1. Also ISBN 1-74114-784-0
- Adrian Desmond, James Moore & Janet Browne (2007). Charles Darwin. Oxford and New York: Oxford University Press. ISBN 978-0-19-921354-2.
- Browne, Janet (2009). "Darwin the Scientist". Cold Spring Harbor Symposia on Quantitative Biology. 74: 1–7. doi:10.1101/sqb.2009.74.047. PMID 20508059.
- Browne, Janet (2010). "Making Darwin: Biography and the Changing Representations of Charles Darwin". Journal of Interdisciplinary History. 40 (3): 347–373. doi:10.1162/jinh.2010.40.3.347. S2CID 145165183.
