= Hugh Falconer =

Scottish scientist and evolutionary theorist (1808–1865)

Hugh Falconer MD, FRS
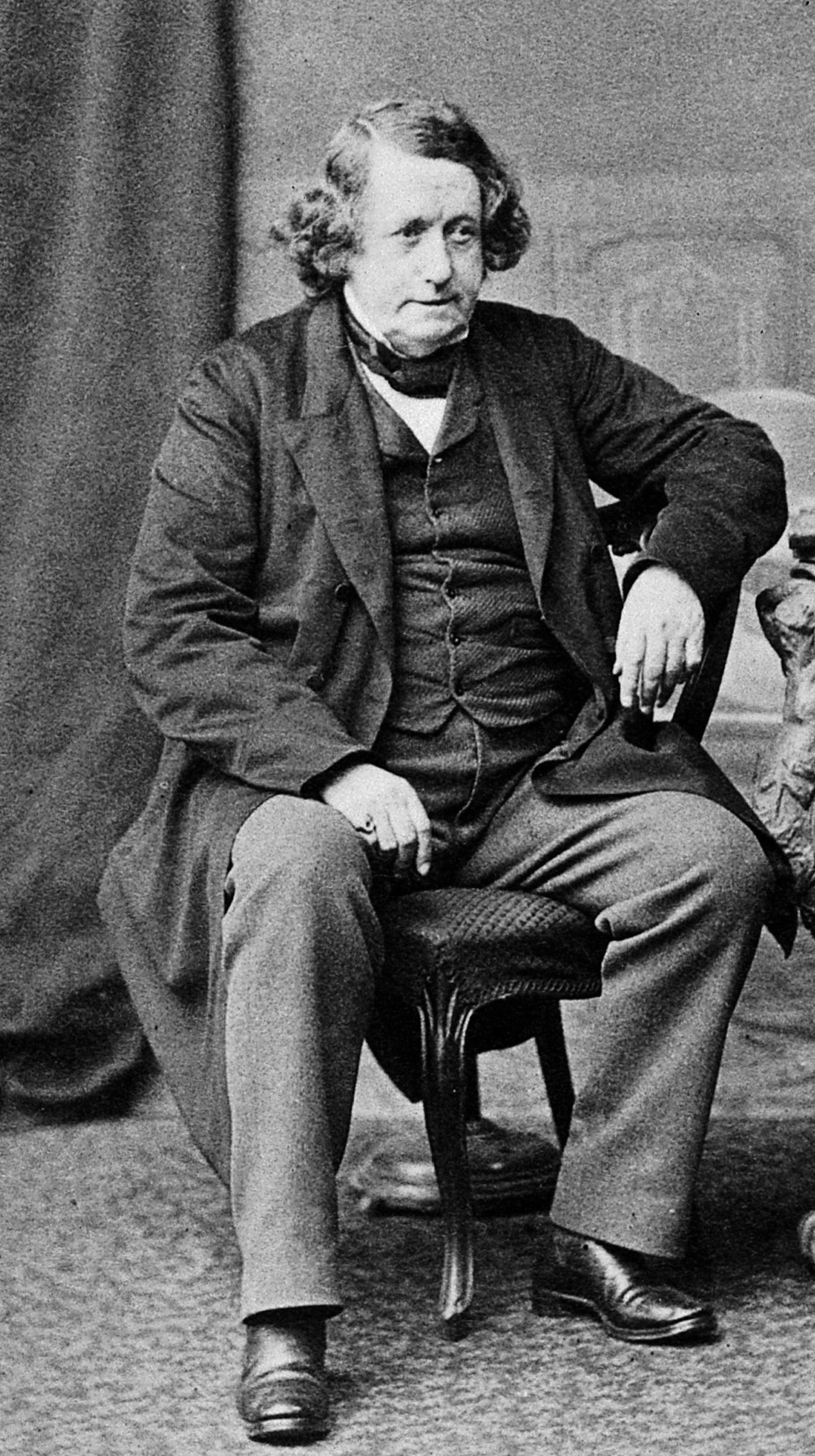
- Born: 29 February 1808; Forres, Scotland
- Died: 31 January 1865 (aged 56); London, England
- Education: University of Aberdeen; University of Edinburgh
- Known for: Precursor of punctuated equilibrium
- Father: David Falconer
- Awards: Wollaston Medal 1837
- Scientific career
- Fields: Geology, Botany, Paleontology
- Workplaces: Saharanpur Botanical Gardens; Calcutta Medical College; Agric. Hort. Soc. Bengal
- Doctoral advisor: Robert Jameson
- Author abbrev. (botany): Falc.

Hugh Falconer (29 February 1808 – 31 January 1865) was a Scottish geologist, botanist, palaeontologist, and paleoanthropologist. He studied the flora, fauna, and geology of India, Assam, Burma, and most of the Mediterranean islands and was the first to suggest the modern evolutionary theory of punctuated equilibrium. He studied the Siwalik fossil beds, and may also have been the first person to discover a fossil ape.

== Early life ==
Falconer was the youngest son of David Falconer of Forres, Elginshire. In 1826 Hugh Falconer graduated at the University of Aberdeen, where he studied natural history. Afterward, he studied medicine in the University of Edinburgh, taking the degree of MD in 1829. During this period he zealously attended the botanical classes of Prof. R. Graham (1786–1845), and those on geology by Prof. Robert Jameson, the teacher of Charles Darwin.

Falconer became an assistant-surgeon on the Bengal establishment of the British East India Company in 1830. Upon his arrival in Bengal he made an examination of the fossil bones from Ava, upper Burma in the possession of the Asiatic Society of Bengal. His description of the fossils, published soon afterward, gave him a recognized position among the scientists of India. Early in 1831 he was posted to the army station at Meerut, India, then in the North Western Provinces, and now in the state of Uttar Pradesh.

== Siwalik Hills ==
In 1832, Falconer became Superintendent of the Saharanpur botanical garden, India, succeeding John Royle. Falconer remained at Saharanpur until 1842, during which time he became widely known for his study of fossil mammals in the Siwalik Hills.

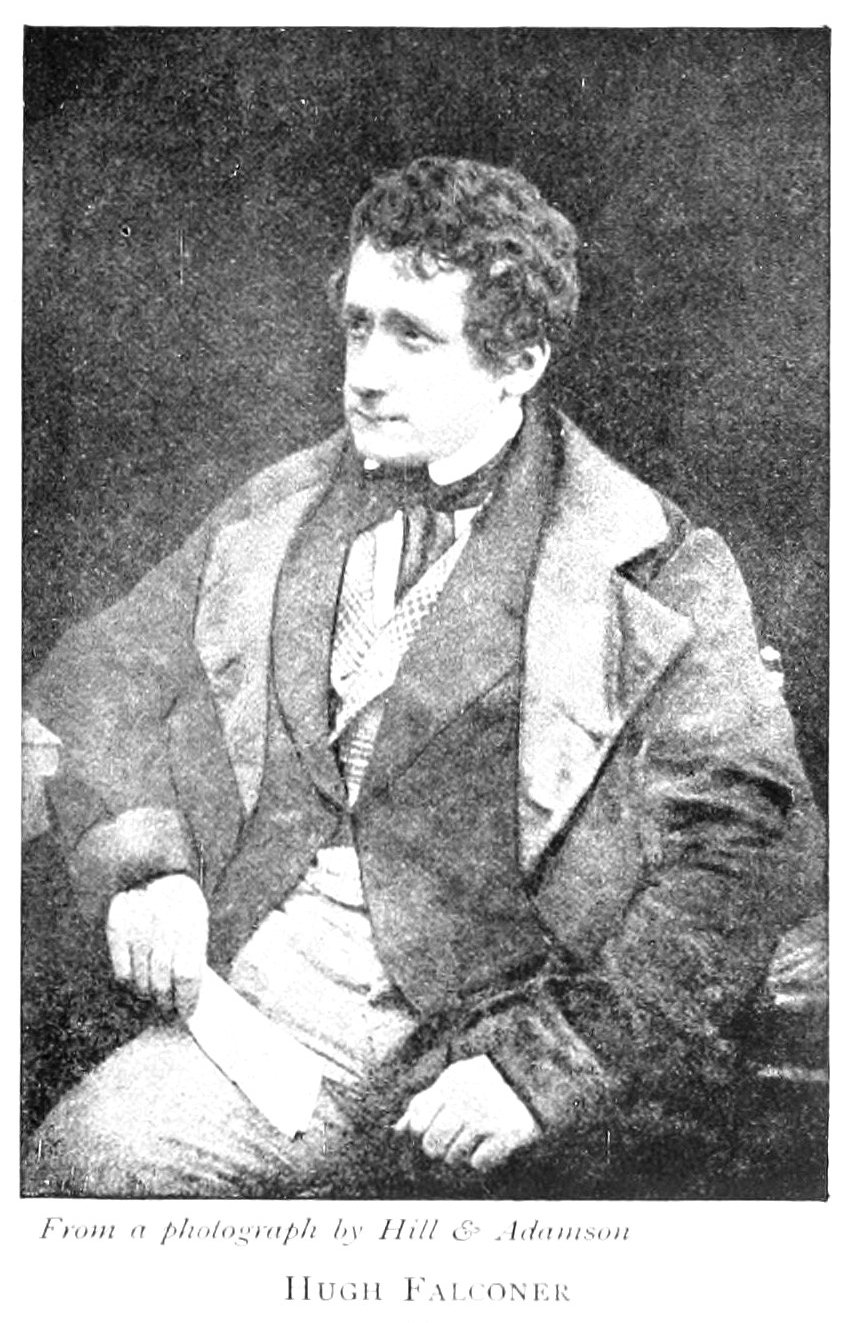
Falconer in 1844

Falconer and his associates may have made the first discovery of a fossil ape, in the 1830s in the Neogene deposits in the Siwalik Hills. In the Tertiary strata of the Siwalik Hills in 1831 Falconer discovered bones of crocodiles, tortoises and other animals. With others, he later brought to light a sub-tropical fossil fauna of unexampled extent and richness, including remains of Mastodon, the colossal ruminant Sivatherium, and the enormous extinct tortoise Colossochelys atlas. Falconer also published a geological description of the Siwálik Hills in 1834. For these valuable discoveries he and Proby Cautley (1802–1871) together received the Wollaston Medal from the Geological Society of London, its highest award, in 1837.

In 1834 Falconer was asked by a Commission of Bengal to investigate the commercial feasibility of growing tea in India. On his recommendation tea plants were introduced, and the resultant black tea became competitive with Chinese teas.

Falconer returned from India in 1842 because of ill health. He brought back 70 large chests of dried plants and 48 cases of fossils, bones and geological specimens. He then travelled throughout Europe making geological observations, and was elected Fellow of the Royal Society in 1845. Continuing in the service of the British East India Company as a naturalist, he pursued research at the British Museum and East India House and prepared casts of the most remarkable fossils for the leading museums of Europe.

== Calcutta ==
In 1847 Falconer became superintendent of the Calcutta Botanical Garden and professor of botany in the Medical College, Calcutta, near his older brother, Alexander Falconer, a Calcutta merchant. Hugh Falconer served as an advisor to the Indian government and the Agricultural and Horticultural Society of Bengal, the de facto colonial "Department of Agriculture". He prepared an important report on the teak forests of Tenasserim, and this saved them from destruction by reckless felling. Through his recommendation, the cultivation of the cinchona in the Indian empire was introduced for the medicinal use of its bark in the treatment of malaria.

== Punctuated equilibrium ==
Falconer was originally a creationist who denied the fact of evolution. In November 1859, Charles Darwin sent Falconer a copy of his On the Origin of Species with a letter which stated "I am fully convinced that you will become, year after year, less fixed in your belief in the immutability of species". In June 1861, Falconer expressed respect in a letter to Darwin for receiving the book. By the early 1860s he reassessed his worldview and came to embrace evolution from his studies of the fossil record.

In 1863, Falconer authored a monograph On the American Fossil elephant of the regions bordering the Gulf of Mexico. A year before he had privately sent the work to Darwin who was delighted to read it. In the work he observed long periods of evolutionary stasis in fossil mammals with short periods of rapid evolutionary change throughout geological time. This research shows great foresight. Niles Eldredge and Stephen Jay Gould developed the same basic theory a century later, a theory known as punctuated equilibrium. According to Gould, the work "anticipates a primary inference of punctuated equilibrium— that a local pattern of abrupt replacement does not signify macromutational transformation in situ, but an origin of the later species from an ancestral population living elsewhere, followed by migration into the local region."

== Later years ==
Having to leave India again in 1855 because of ill health, he spent the remainder of his life examining and comparing fossil species in England and the Continent to those he found in India, notably the species of mastodon, elephant, and rhinoceros. He also described some new mammalia from the Purbeck strata of Wessex. Turning to the subject of human origins, he reported on the bone caves of Sicily, Malta, Gibraltar, Gower, and Brixham. He discovered the dwarf elephant species Palaeoloxodon falconeri on Sicily and Malta, and also found the bones of the flightless giant swan Cygnus falconeri in Malta at Għar Dalam .

Falconer served as vice-president of the Royal Society 1863–1864. Although suffering from exposure and overwork, Falconer returned hastily from Gibraltar to support Charles Darwin's claim to the Copley Medal in 1864. Falconer succumbed in London, England, on 31 January 1865 from rheumatic disease of the heart and lungs. He is buried in Kensal Green Cemetery, London.

The flower Rhododendron falconeri was named after Falconer by Joseph Dalton Hooker.

Falconer's botanical notes, with 450 coloured drawings of Indian plants, were deposited in the library at Kew Gardens, together with some of the specimens he collected. A marble bust was placed in the rooms of the Royal Society of London, and another in the Asiatic Society of Bengal, Calcutta. A competitive Falconer scholarship of £100 per year was created for graduates in science or medicine of the University of Edinburgh.

The Falconer Museum in Forres, Scotland (57.609906°N 3.612346°W) which is closed as of April 2020, housed, amongst numerous other collections, the many Falconer finds that had not been sent to other institutions like the library of Kew Gardens or the British Museum, including Palaeolithic finds that enabled "visitors of the Falconer Museum [to] look at three different species of humans at once, homo erectus, homo neanderthalensis and homo sapiens".

== Selected publications ==
- Hugh Falconer and Proby T. Cautley, Fauna Antiqua Sivalensis, being the Fossil Zoology of the Sewalik Hills, in the North of India, Part I, Proboscidea, London (1846), with a series of 107 plates by G. H. Ford appearing between 1846 and 1849.
- On the American Fossil Elephant of the Regions Bordering the Gulf of Mexico, (E. Columbi, Falc.): With General Observations on the Living and Extinct Species (1863)
- Palæontological memoirs and notes of the late Hugh Falconer, edited, with a biographical sketch, by Charles Murchison, M.D., 2 vols., London, R. Hardwicke (1868). OCLC: 2847098. vol. II online at archive.org
- Hugh Falconer, Darwin Correspondence Project: extended bibliography
- Falconer's works were documented in the Royal Society's Catalogue of Scientific Papers, vol. ii (1968).

== Literature ==
- Patrick J. Boylan, The Falconer papers, Forres, Leicester: Leicestershire Museums, Art Galleries and Records Service (1977).
- Grace, Lady Prestwich, Essays descriptive and biographical, Edinburgh and London, William Blackwood (1901).
- Charles T. Gaudin, "Modifications apportées par M. Falconer à la faune du Val d'Arno", Bulletin des Séances de la Société Vaudoise des Sciences Naturelles 6: 130–1 (1859).
- Patrick J. Boylan, "The controversy of the Moulin-Quignon jaw: the role of Hugh Falconer," in Images of the Earth: Essays in the History of the Environmental Sciences, Ludmilla J. Jordanova and Roy S. Porter, eds., Chalfont St. Giles, Bucks., British Society for the History of Science. (1979) ISBN 0-906450-00-4
- Leonard G. Wilson, "Brixham Cave and Sir Charles Lyell's . . . the Antiquity of man: the roots of Hugh Falconer's attack on Lyell," Archives of Natural History 23: 79–97 (1996).
- Murchison, Charles (1868). Biographical sketch of Hugh Falconer, A.M., M.D. London.
- Kenneth A. R. Kennedy and Russell L. Ciochon, "A canine tooth from the Siwaliks: first recorded discovery of a fossil ape?" Journal of Human Evolution, Vol. 14, No. 3 (July, 1999). ISSN 0393-9375 (Print) ISSN 1824-310X (Online).
- Anne O'Connor, "Hugh Falconer, Joseph Prestwich and the Gower caves", Studies in Speleology, Vol. 14, pp 75 – 79 (2006).
- Tim Murray (archaeologist), "Hugh Falconer: Botanist, palaeontologist, controversialist", in Life-writing in the History of Archaeology: Critical perspectives, 2023, Clare Lewis and Gabriel Moshenskapp eds., pp 265-280, Hugh Falconer: Botanist, palaeontologist, controversialist
