= Caroline Wedgwood =

British gardener (1800–1888)

Caroline Sarah Wedgwood
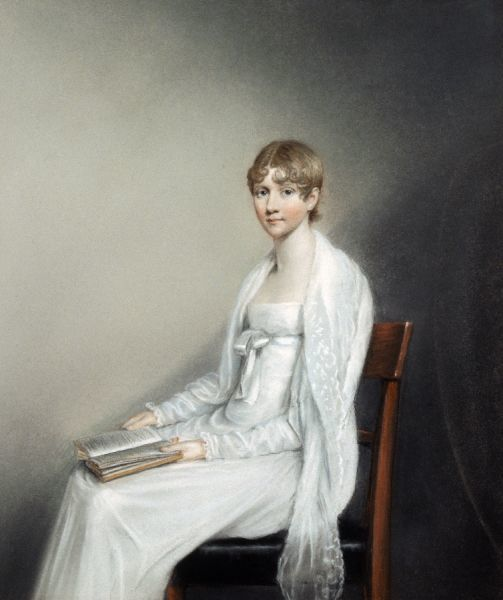
- Caroline, age 16
- Born: Caroline Sarah Darwin; September 14, 1800; Shrewsbury, Shropshire, England
- Died: January 5, 1888 (aged 87); Leith Hill Place, Surrey, England
- Known for: Creator of the Rhododendron Wood, Surrey
- Spouse: Josiah Wedgwood III (m. 1837)
- Children: 4
- Parents: Robert Darwin (father); Susannah Darwin (mother)
- Relatives: Charles Darwin (brother)
- Family: Darwin–Wedgwood family

Caroline Sarah Wedgwood (née Darwin; 1800–1888) was an English botanist. She was a member of the Darwin–Wedgwood family and the elder sister of English naturalist Charles Darwin. In the 1850s she planted the Rhododendron Wood at Leith Hill, Surrey, which in 1944 was bequeathed to the National Trust by her grandson, composer Ralph Vaughan Williams.

== Early years ==
Caroline was born on 14 September 1800 at Shrewsbury to Susannah (née Wedgwood) and Dr Robert Waring Darwin. She was the second of the six children.

Caroline's father was a respected physician, a shrewd businessmen and a keen gardener, described by many contemporaries as a talkative, liberal and freethinking person with a "theory for almost everything which occurred". Large medical practice, a series of profitable investments and a number of private loans made Dr. Darwin prosperous. but did not guarantee material comfort to his wife and children. The thriftiness and frugality of Robert Waring were much talked about in the extended family circles. Emma Wedgwood - a niece and a future daughter-in-law of Dr. Darwin - was once horrified at Caroline expressing gratitude for lighting a fire on a cold December afternoon, something she was evidently not used to and saw as a luxury rather than a necessity. Emma was among the nephews and nieces who felt Dr. Darwin was domineering, even if kind and genial. According to Emma there was generally a 'want of liberty at Shewsbury whenever the Doctor was in the room', 'no one could be quite at ease in his presence'. The complicated relationship of Charles Darwin with his father became a topic of much debate, but little has been said about the relationship between Robert Waring and his daughter Caroline.

Susannah Darwin, known within the family as Sukey, was an accomplished harpsichordist. Caroline who was described as 'not regularly handsome but very effective' has clearly inherited her looks from Susannah: their portraits show a strong physical resemblance.

In 1817, Susannah, who was frequently ill, died of an unspecified gastroenterological disorder. After her mother's death, Caroline together with the eldest sister Marianne took charge of the household and oversaw the education of the younger siblings: 8 year old Charles and 7-year old Catherine. In a 1881 letter, Charles Darwin wrote to Caroline: "I remembers well that you always acted like a mother to me and Catherine". He also remembered Caroline as being "extremely kind, clever and zealous", in fact "too zealous in trying to improve me". This account of Caroline as an intelligent and capable person approaching things she set out to do with a lot of ardour, but prone to fussing around, is corroborated by other family members. Elizabeth Wedgwood talked about her cousin "busy scrattling" when she was preparing to host the girls for the singing lessons at the Mount - Darwins' home in Shrewsbury. The word 'scrattle' is a family invention that according to Caroline's niece, Henrietta "Etty" Litchfield, meant 'tidying up, arranging and seeing to things'. Etty also recalled her mother's delight in being in the company of Caroline, who imbued the atmosphere with "the mixture of vivacity, sweetness, abounding life, and deep feeling". Caroline's uncle, Josiah "Jos" Wedgwood II noted that she had "so much taste of beauty that is a pleasure to travel with her".

Uncle Jos spoke from experience: in spring 1827 he talked Caroline into accompanying him to Geneva to collect his daughters, Emma and Fanny, who were staying in Switzerland with their Aunt Jessie Sismondi (nee Allen). Charles was also invited but only went as far as Paris.

== Marriage and family life ==
In 1837 Caroline married her cousin and an heir to the pottery company Josiah (Jos) Wedgwood III. In the 19th century Britain this practice was fairly common: 1 in every 25 upper-middle class marriages happened between the first cousins, but the incidence of cousin marriages was even higher in the Darwin-Wedgwood family. Caroline and Jos have known each other for their whole lives and most of the relatives including Josiah's mother Elizabeth (Bessy) nee Allen and both of their fathers who had shared business interests had been hoping for the wedding to happen for more than a decade. Josiah proposed in June, and on 1 August the couple was married at St Chad's Church, Shrewsbury.

While Josiah was an active partner in the pottery business, the family lived at Clayton - 3 miles away from the Wedgwood main ceramics factory Etruria Works in Staffordshire. In 1838, they had their first child, a daughter called Sophie Marianne. Sophie died only a few months later on 31 January 1839 at Maer - childhood home of Josiah - a few days after the wedding of his sister Emma to Caroline's brother Charles. The parents were devastated and the whole family witnessed their grief. Elizabeth Wedgwood remembered Caroline being "very unwell" but doing "her utmost not to yield". Josiah appeared depressed and it is not clear how much emotional support he was able to offer to his wife. According to Elizabeth "the chief part of his feeling is for her, but he often cannot command himself when he is sitting with her, and is obliged to leave the room". As worried as Elizabeth was for her brother, she knew that once they got back he would have his work to distract from and to help to cope with the tragedy. Her major concern was for Caroline: "what poor Caroline will find to do I cannot think; for the last so many months the thoughts of this precious child and the preparations for it have occupied her in an intense way that I never saw in anyone else". Later family correspondence hints at Caroline finding consolation in nature and gardening: in March 1839 she was "a good deal out of doors" and was asking for some plants to be sent to her from Seabridge.

3 years later, the couple, whose loss was still raw, had another daughter - Katherine Elizabeth Sophy, known to the family as Sophy. In 1843 and 1846, two more daughters were born: Margaret Susan - future mother of the composer Ralph Vaughan Williams - and Lucy Caroline.

In 1847, Josiah retired from the family business. He bought Leith Hill Place, an elegant 17th century country house, and brought his wife and their young children down South to the Surrey Hills.

== Interest in nature and the Rhododendron Wood ==
Caroline came from a long line of nature enthusiasts. Her maternal uncle John Wedgwood was a founding member of the Royal Horticultural Society. On her father's side the great-uncle also called Robert Waring wrote a botanical textbook and the grandfather Erasmus chiefly remembered for Zoonomia composed a scientific poem The Botanic Garden second part of which is called The Loves of the Plants. Some of the plants mentioned in the poem like white fly-catchers and ornamental opium poppies were still in all probability growing in Shrewsbury in Caroline's time. There were also orange trees in pots, specimen primulas, ferns, roses, geraniums, azaleas, camellias and a multitude of horticultural rarities. Charles wrote to Caroline in 1833 while voyaging on Beagle: 'I often think of the Garden at home as a Paradise on a fine summer's evening, when the birds are singing'. Maybe among the birds he had in mind were the descendants of the Red Avadavats that Caroline who has had 'a fancy for birds' got delivered from London in 1827.

When Caroline moved to Leith Hill she transformed two fields and hedgerow into a formal park now known as the Rhododendron Wood. She planted the area with giant sequoias, azaleas and rhododendrons, which are exotic shade loving shrubs with glossy leaves and sweet scented flowers. Many of the rhododendron specimen came from Asia, possibly via Sir Joseph Dalton Hooker; director of the Kew Gardens and friend of her brother.

In 1987 the wood was damaged by the great storm, but some of the original plantings survived. These include:

- Sequoiadendron giganteum - giant redwood native to the North America (California)
- Sequoia sempervirens - coastal redwood trees also native to the North America are among the tallest and the longest living in the world

Location of both suggest they may have formed a feature along the main driveway to Leith Hill Place

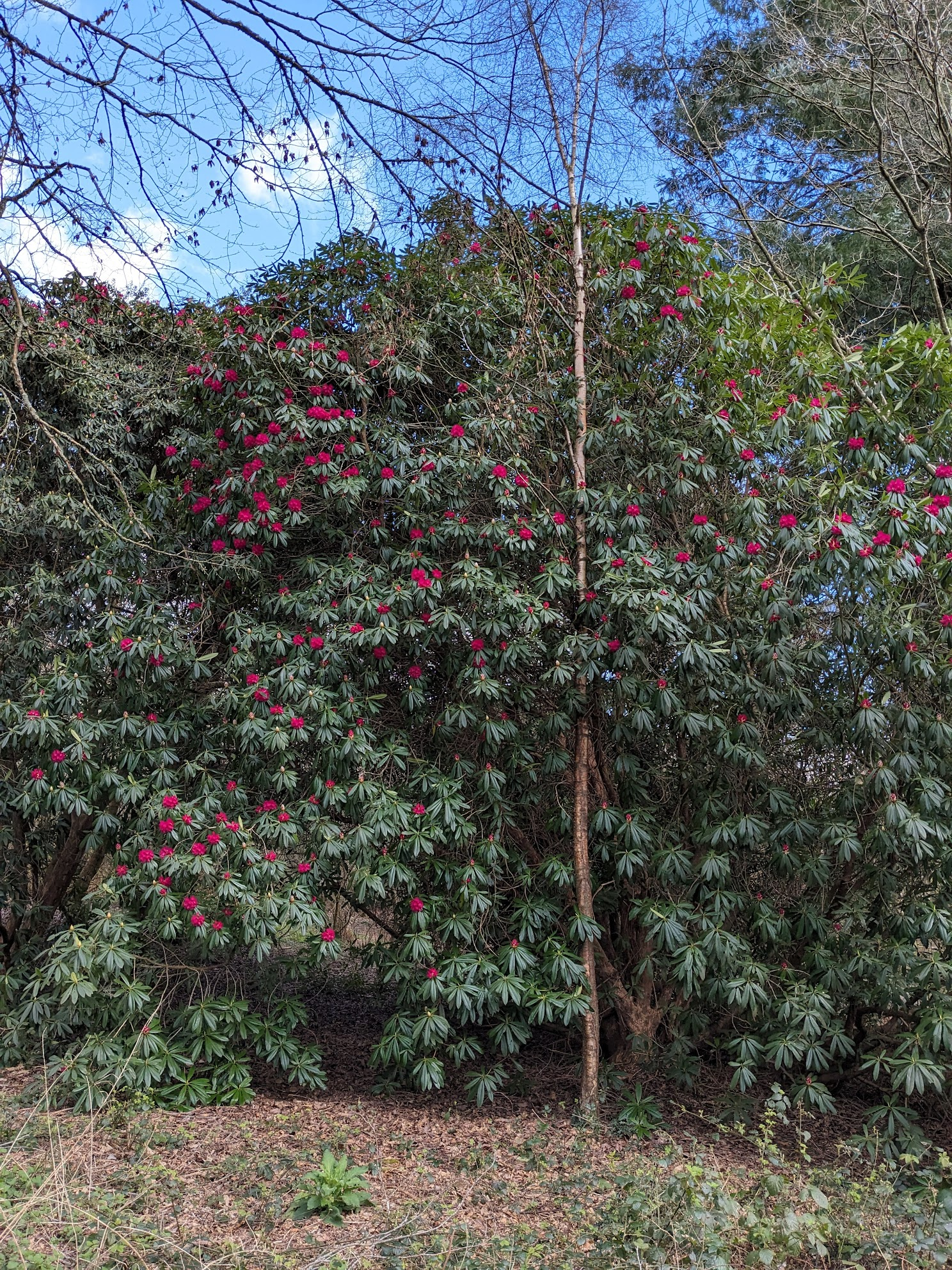
Rhododendron 'Smithii Group' at Rhododendron Wood, Leith Hill, Surrey, original planting by Caroline Wedgwood

- Smithii Group - tree-like rhododendrons with red flowers native to Himalayas, China and Thailand

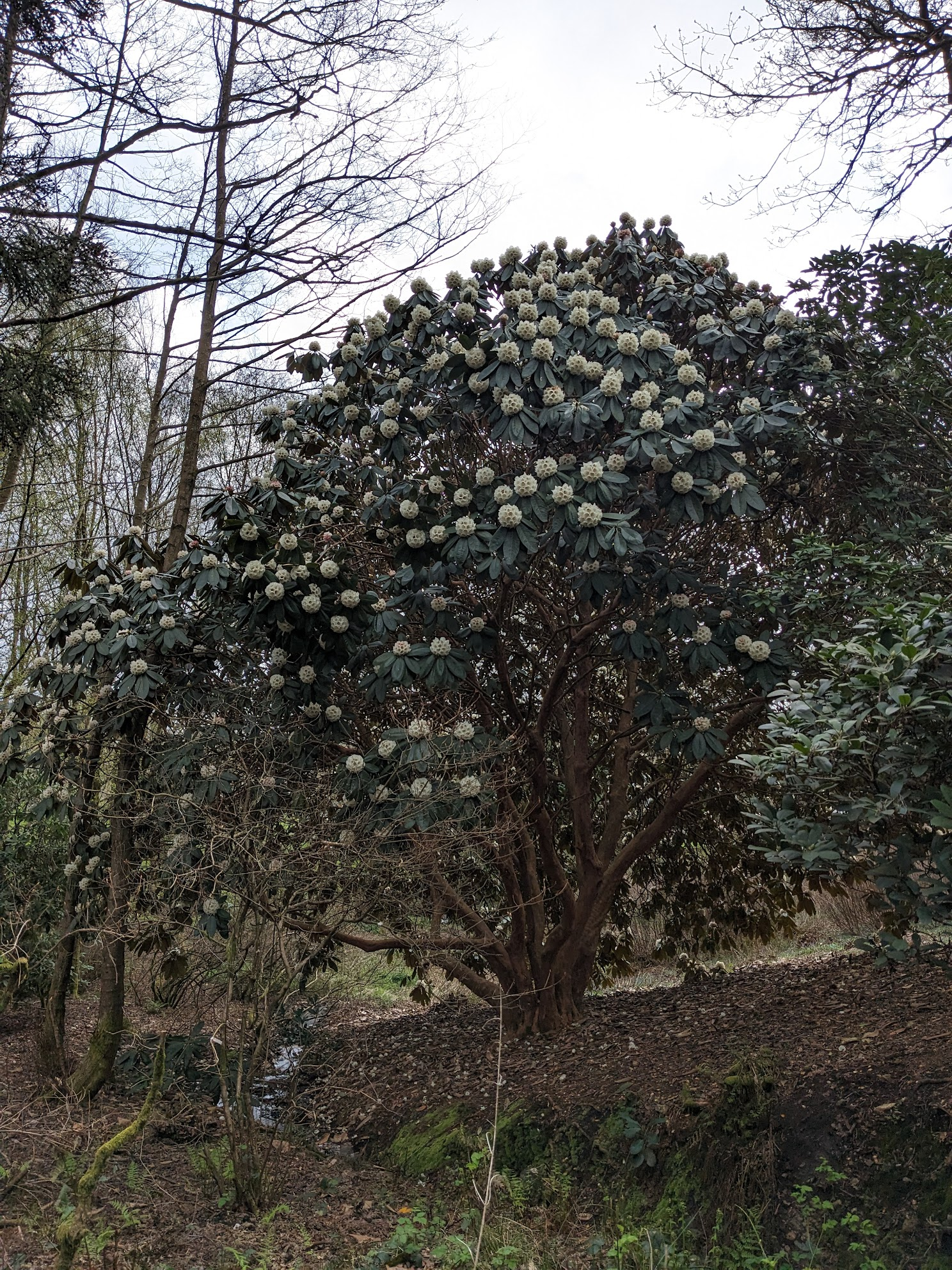
Rhododendron falconeri at Rhododendron Wood, Leith Hill, Surrey, original planting by Caroline Wedgwood

- Rhododendron falconeri - white flowering shrubs with large leaves characterised by rusty coloured woolly undersides, native to the mountains of North India. Emma Darwin mentioned the flowers of these specimen in her 1846 letter to Hooker: 'We have just received a blossom of Rhod Falconeri which has flowered in the open air at my brothers on Leith Hill Surrey'.

The Darwins were frequent visitors to Leith Hill. Dozens of surviving letters between the members of the Darwin-Wedgwood clan mention Charles and his family spending time and enjoying 'a walk in the wood' at the Surrey estate of Jos and Caroline.

The Rhododendrons from the Caroline's garden - now cared for by the National Trust and open to the public - are included in '50 Great Trees' by Simon Toomer, Curator of Living Collections at the Kew Gardens, for they provide 'a glimpse into the domestic life of Charles Darwin and his family at a time when the story of life on Earth was being unravelled'.

== Relationship with Charles Darwin ==
Caroline was a mother-like figure to the younger siblings including her brother Charles. In his memory she occupied a space normally reserved for a parent: the first thing he ever remembered was sitting on Caroline's lap. When thinking about the childhood Darwin spoke of being looked after, tutored and, periodically, told off by his elder sister. Although Caroline took her duty of care rather seriously and was capable of being strict, she doted on Charles. She referred to him as 'my dear Bobby' and looked 'so happy and proud' when the younger brother returned home from his Beagle expedition. She was worried about his health and safety abroad, but confessed to Elizabeth Wedgwood: 'Now we have him really again at home I intend to begin to be glad he went this expedition & now I can allow he has gained happiness & interest for the rest of his life'. Of course, Caroline kept every little scrap of paper sent by Darwin from his travels including the extracts from the voyaging journals.

The two siblings maintained a close relationship for their entire life, regularly paying each other visits and exchanging letters. Text and Network analysis of Darwin correspondence reveals that in contrast to some other female family members, for example his wife and other sisters, Caroline was actively engaged in the scientific discussions with her brother. She expressed opinions and questioned Charles on a whole range of topics and he tended to take her input seriously. On one occasion Charles wrote to Caroline: 'Your doubt and queries are perfectly correct. Lyell was bothered on same point and I have not expressed myself clearly'. The point in question is the descent of the domesticated species that Charles Darwin and the Scottish geologist Charles Lyell were corresponding on in 1859. Darwin then continues his letter to Caroline with a detailed clarification of how the differences in the domestic dogs relate to the process of their domestication.

It has been well established that Darwin used the family as a casual sounding board for his ideas, but his letters to Caroline often go beyond that in their content and contain the amount of scientific details comparable in variety and specificity to those found in the correspondence with his close friend and cousin William Fox as well as with some of the colleagues. What is more, Darwin repeatedly asked Caroline to do some background research for him to establish certain facts or to summarise the content of someone else's work. In one of the letters Darwin's younger sister Catherine passes the following information to him: 'Caroline desires me to tell you that neither Procter, Miers, nor Caldcleugh are in the Library, only Head, which C. [Caroline] will read, and examine about what you mention, and then write to you'. At this time Darwin was working on the presentation for the Geological Society of London on his on his theory of sea floor uplift along the Chilean coast line and the 3 books Caroline couldn't get hold of were: Robert Proctor, Narrative of a Journey across the Cordillera of the Andes and of a Residence in Lima, John Miers, Travels in Chile and La Plata - Including Accounts Respecting the Geography, Geology, Statistics, Government, Finances, Agriculture, Manners and Customs, and the Mining Operations in Chile, and Alexander Caldcleugh, Travels in South America, During the Years 1819-20-21 - Containing an Account of the Present State of Brazil, Buenos Ayres and Chile. The book that Caroline found and pre-processed for her brother's research was Francis Bond Head's Rough Notes Taken during some Rapid Journeys across the Pampas and among the Andes (1826).

Charles Darwin has clearly trusted his sister to summarise and assemble material for him otherwise he wouldn't have asked for her help over and over again. At the same time, Caroline's time and efforts were taken for granted. When Darwin asked Fox for his assistance he spoke at length about how he didn't want to trouble William:

'the smallest contributions, thankfully accepted—descriptions of offspring of all crosses between all domestic birds & animals dogs, cats &c &c very valuable— Don't forget, if your half-bred African Cat should die, that I should be very much obliged, for its carcase sent up in little hamper for skeleton.— it or any cross-bred pigeon, fowl, duck, &c &c will be more acceptable than the finest haunch of Venison or the finest turtle.— Perhaps all this will only bothers you— So I will add no more...'.

In contrast when a request was sent to Caroline it sounded like:

'Now will you be a good lady & look at Ellis' Polynesian Researches, & see if he does not at Tahiti make some remarks about the belief that Capt. Cook's visits produced some kinds of illness'.

This difference in tone reveals a casual misogyny that permeated the 19th century society. Even the most enlightened of men surrounded by numerous real life examples of capable women failed to question the status quo and thought a man to be ultimately 'superior to woman'. In his book The Descent of Man Charles Darwin stated:

'The chief distinction in the intellectual powers of the two sexes is shewn by man's attaining to a higher eminence, in whatever he takes up, than can woman - whether requiring deep thought, reason, or imagination, or merely the use of the senses and hands'.

Perhaps, this is why Caroline has never been credited by her younger brother for her assistance in his research.

== Political views ==
=== On slavery ===
Caroline was a committed abolitionist and in her 1833 letter to Charles Darwin wrote: 'it is delightful to think in a few years we shall have no more slaves-that alone is enough to make one properly value this Parliament'. The Slavery Abolition act came into force in 1834.

=== On education ===
In 1842 Charles Darwin wrote to his wife Emma: 'I think I have picked up some notions by our education-fights; Caroline is enthusiastic about M. Guizot, and says she agrees in all her directions'. Élizabeth Guizot was a French author writing about the education of children and the wife of François Guizot - French historian and politician who served as a Minister of Education in 1832, ambassador to London, Foreign Minister in 1840, and Prime Minister of France in 1847-1848. During his tenure as a Minister of Education Guizot oversaw the creation of primary schools in every French commune.

== Widowhood and death ==
Caroline's husband Josiah died on 11 March 1880.

In 1881 she received an inheritance from her brother Erasmus Alvey who had bequeathed 1/6 of his estate to Caroline. She wished to divide her share between the three daughters and approached the younger brother Charles to confirm with the executor whether the immediate split was possible. Charles who was trying to do the same for his children confirmed the feasibility of the set up.

Caroline Wedgwood died at Leith Hill Place, Surrey, on 5 January 1888, aged 87. She left behind an estate of £31,902. Her cousin and sister-in-law Emma Darwin wrote to her daughter Etty 3 days after the death of Caroline: "I feel that I have lost the only real link with old times. I do not count my brothers, as I think most men, and they especially, do not like remembering. [...] Hers was a very wonderful nature in the power of her affections and interests".
