= Rhododendron Wood =

British garden of historical importance

Coordinates: 51°10′21″N 0°22′57″W

Rhododendron wood is a garden on the southern slopes of Leith Hill in Surrey, England. It is of historic and horticultural significance, noted for its collection of rare rhododendrons and redwood trees

== History ==
Rhododendron Wood was planted in the mid 19th century by an English gardener Caroline Wedgwood (née Darwin). When her husband Josiah Wedgwood III retired from the family pottery business, he bought Leith Hill Place, a 17th-century country house in Surrey. In 1847 the family - Josiah, Caroline and three young daughters - moved from Staffordshire to their new estate in the Surrey Hills.

Caroline transformed two fields and a hedgerow next to the house into a formal park. She planted giant sequoias, azaleas and rhododendrons in the area. Many of the rhododendron specimens came from Asia, possibly via Sir Joseph Dalton Hooker, the director of Kew Gardens and a good friend of Caroline's younger brother Charles Darwin.

In 1987 the wood was damaged by the great storm, but some of the original plantings survived. These include:

- Sequoiadendron giganteum - giant redwood native to the North America (California)
- Sequoia sempervirens - coastal redwood trees also native to the North America are among the tallest and the longest living in the world

Location of both suggest they may have formed a feature along the main driveway to Leith Hill Place.

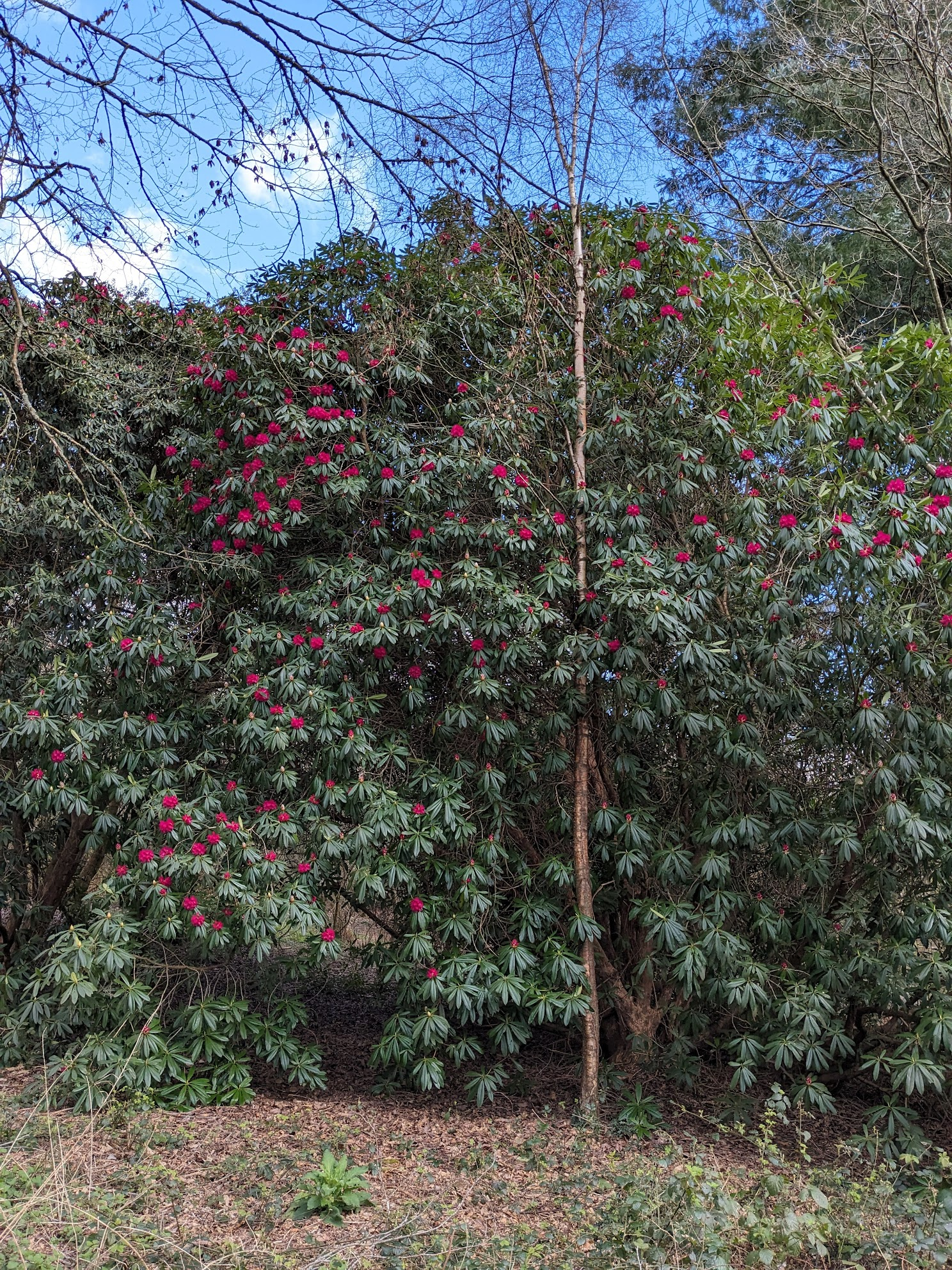
Rhododendron × smithii Group, original planting by Caroline Wedgwood

- Smithii Group - tree-like rhododendrons with red flowers native to Himalayas, China and Thailand

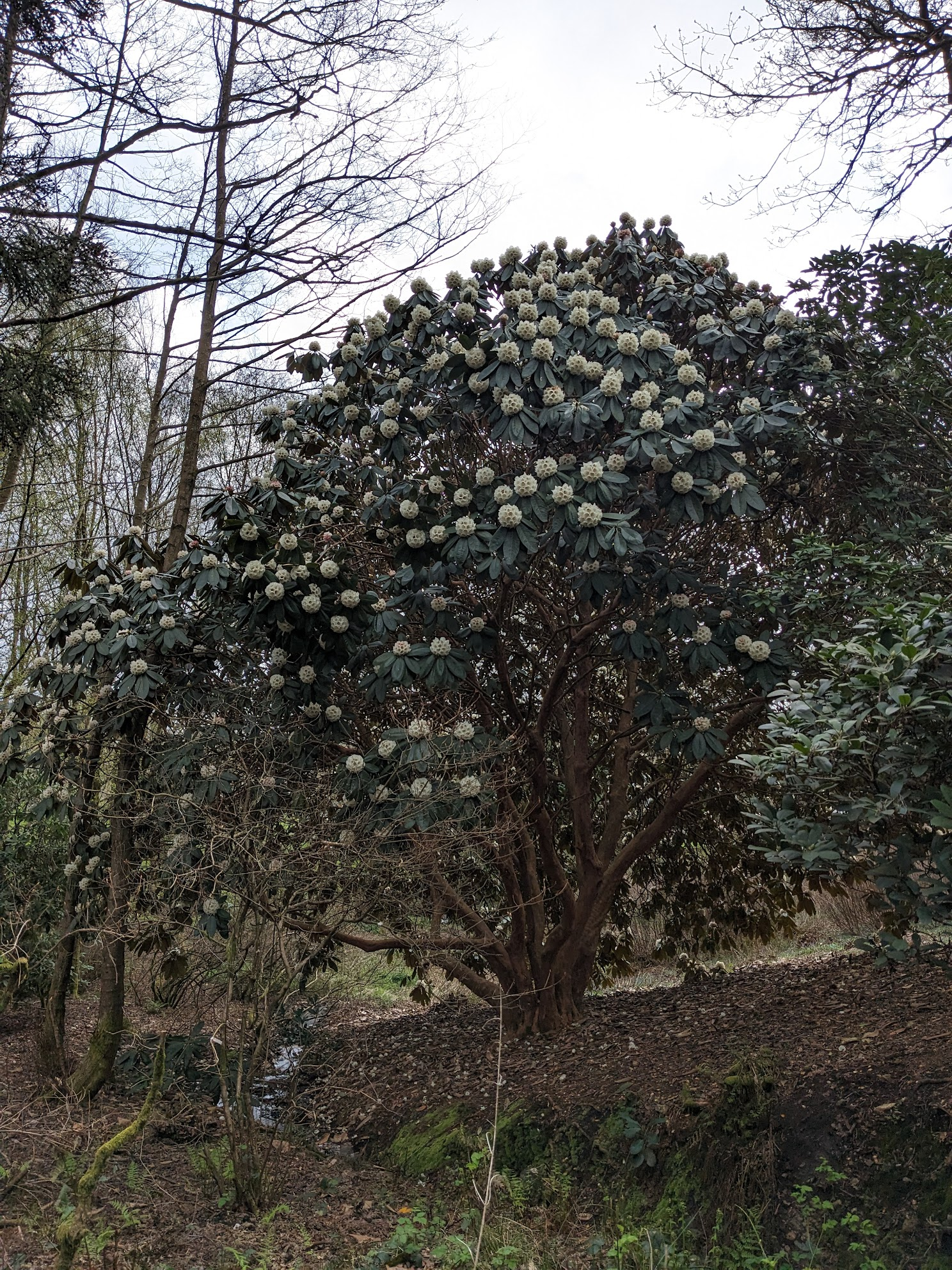
Rhododendron falconeri at Rhododendron Wood Leith Hill in Surrey, original planting by Caroline Wedgwood

- Rhododendron falconeri - white flowering shrubs with large leaves characterised by rusty coloured woolly undersides, native to the mountains of North India. Emma Darwin - sister of Caroline's husband married to her brother Charles - mentioned the flowers of this specimen in the 1846 letter to Hooker: "We have just received a blossom of Rhod Falconeri which has flowered in the open air at my brothers on Leith Hill Surrey".

Darwins were frequent visitors to Leith Hill. Dozens of surviving letters between the members of the Darwin-Wedgwood clan mention Charles and his family spending time and enjoying "a walk in the wood" at the Surrey estate of Josiah and Caroline.

The rhododendrons from Caroline's garden are included in "50 Great Trees" by Simon Toomer, Curator of Living Collections at Kew Gardens, for they provide "a glimpse into the domestic life of Charles Darwin and his family at a time when the story of life on Earth was being unravelled".

In 1944 the composer Ralph Vaughan Williams bequeathed the Rhododendron Wood planted by his grandmother to the National Trust.

As of 2024, the wood is managed by the National Trust and is open to the public. British artist Alison Carlier created an audioguide that features music of Ralph Vaughan Williams to accompany the walks around the garden.

== Rhododendron Wood today ==
The wood is managed by the National Trust and is open to the public. In addition to the originally planted specimens, the following trees growing within the confines of the wood are of particular significance:

- Rhododendron 'Polar Bear' (R. auriculatum × R. decorum subsp. diaprepes) - very late flowering rhododendron with heavily scented white trumpet-shaped flowers

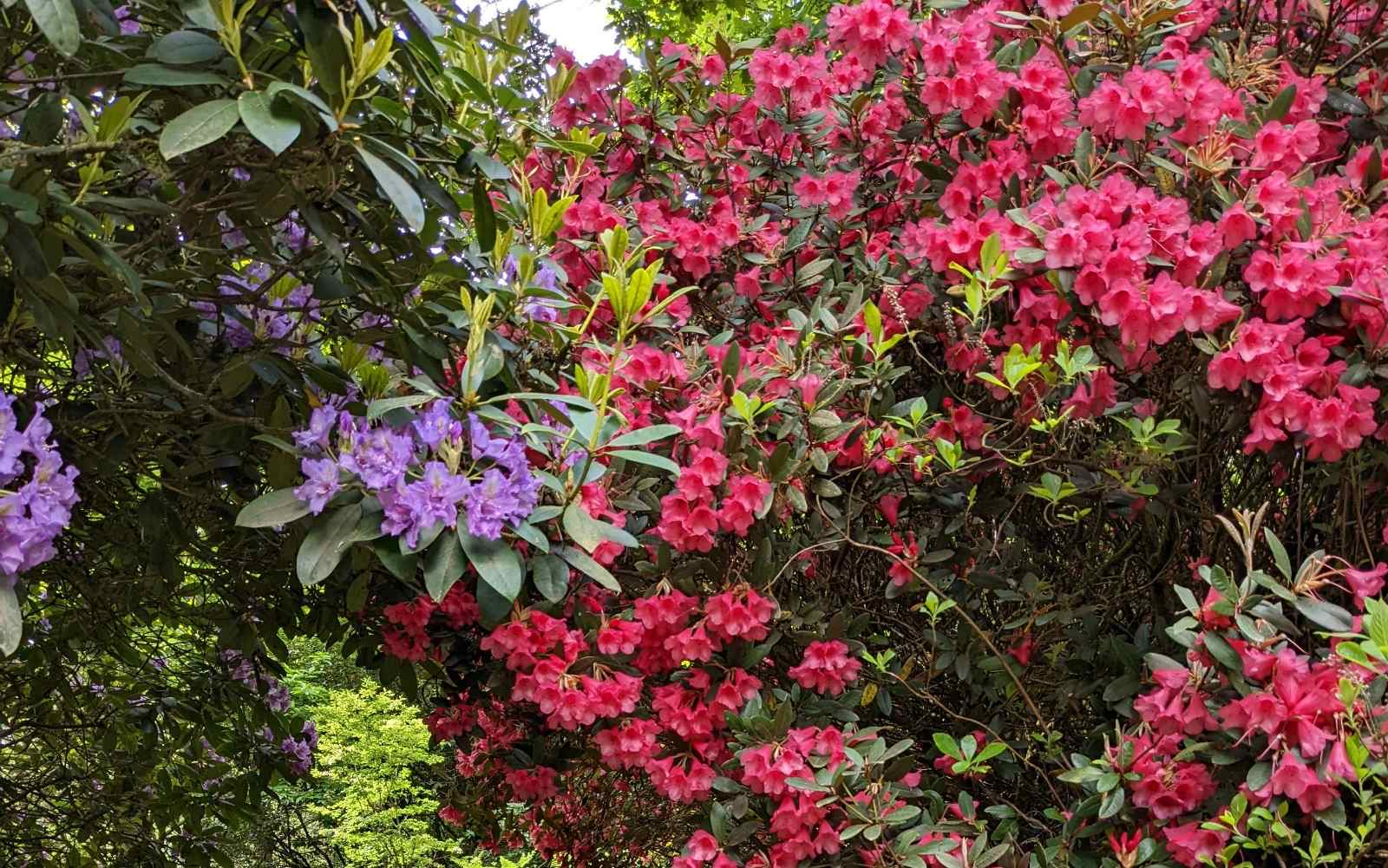
Rhododendron 'Winsome' (right)

- Rhododendron 'Winsome'- remontant rhododendron blooming twice a year: red buds in winter and cerise blossom in June
- Rhododendron rex - native to China and India characterised by huge white flowers and large leaves with fawn woolly undersides
- Rhododendron glischroides (putative var. arachnoideum)- rhododendron from Upper Myanmar extremely rare in cultivation; natural habitat is in the altitudes above 3,000 meters; has hairy leaf stem, produces pink flowers in April–May
- Rhododendron macabeanum - has large pale yellow bloom and large leaves with white wooly indumentum
- London plane (Platanus × hispanica) - hybrid of oriental plane and American sycamore introduced in the 18th century; now a popular urban tree, is often severely pruned, has characteristic flaking "camouflage" bark, can grow up to 30m, produces spiky pom pom fruits eaten by naturalised parakeets
- Dawn redwood (Metasequoia glyptostroboides) - deciduous conifer with twisting trunk originally described from fossils, thought to be extinct until discovered in China in 1941
- English oak (Pedunculate oak, Quercus robur) - important tree for British woodland ecosystem and historical agricultural practices; when alive oaks are hosts to numerous species of insects, fungi and lichen, when dead and rotting or hollow - to beetles and bats; mature 40–50 years old oak could produce up to 50,000 acorns, these nuts growing on long stalks or peduncles (hence the name) were once a major food source for wild boars and reared pigs
- Paper/canoe birch (Betula papyrifera) - native to North America, as the name suggests has been used by the indigenous people to make canoes, has waterproof peeling bark
- Tulip tree (Liriodendron tulipifera) - there are 2 specimens of the tulip tree in the area: the one within the confines of the wood is grown from the cutting of the parent tree in the field next to the Leith Hill Place. The latter tree is believed to be one of the largest and oldest - over 250 years - in the country thus predating Wedgwoods and Caroline's planting programme.
- Weeping yew (Taxus baccata 'Dovastoniana') - has poisonous leaves and seeds, very hard and durable wood
- River birch (Betula nigra) - grows by the water in wet ground, has flaky bark, native to the east of the United States
- Japanese cedar (Cryptomeria japonica) - can grow up to 30-55m, native to Japan and China, used there as an important source of timber

British artist Alison Carlier created an audioguide that features music of Ralph Vaughan Williams to accompany the walks around the garden. Separate summer and winter versions are available.

== Management and diseases ==
The effects of the great storm of October 1987 when many mature trees and shrubs were damaged are still felt within the wood. Trees planted to re-establish the canopy and provide shade for the rhododendrons continue to need periodic thinning. The thinning is carried out by the National Trust team.

To mitigate the threat to the living plant collection from the sudden oak death (Phytophthora ramorum) that, despite the name could infect and potentially kill other trees, Rhododendron ponticum - a carrier - is removed from the wood. Other rhododendrons are being closely monitored for any signs of the disease.
