= John Allen Wedgwood =

English priest (1796–1882)

The Reverend John Allen Wedgwood
- Born: 1796
- Died: 19 July 1882 (aged 85–86); Winchcomb, Gloucestershire
- Education: Westminster School
- Parent(s): John Wedgwood; Louisa Jane Allen
- Family: Darwin–Wedgwood family

The Reverend John Allen Wedgwood (1796 – 19 July 1882), normally known as Allen Wedgwood was rector of Maer Staffordshire.

== Life ==
Wedgwood was the fifth of six children and the fourth and youngest son of John Wedgwood, the horticulturist, of Etruria, Staffordshire and Cote House, Bristol, and his wife Louisa Jane Allen, daughter of John Bartlett Allen of Cresselly, Pembrokeshire. His paternal grandfather had been the potter Josiah Wedgwood who died the year prior to his birth, and the Josiah Wedgwood & Sons pottery company that he had founded gave the family considerable wealth.

He was educated at Westminster School. He was ordained as a deacon in the Church of England in 1821 and a priest in 1822. He was admitted to Downing College, Cambridge in 1824 as a ten-year man.

On 29 January 1839, he officiated at the wedding of his cousins Charles Darwin and Emma Wedgwood in an Anglican ceremony arranged to also suit the Unitarians in St Peter's Church at Maer Hall. Some years later, aged he also officiated at the funeral of Charles' brother Erasmus Alvey Darwin in 1881. He himself died the year after in Winchcomb, Gloucestershire.
