= Josiah Wedgwood II =

British potter (1769–1843)

- Josiah Wedgwood II by William Owen.
- Born: 3 April 1769
- Died: 12 July 1843 (aged 74)
- Spouse: Elizabeth Allen
- Children: 9
- Parent(s): Josiah Wedgwood; Sarah Wedgwood
- Relatives: Thomas Wedgwood (brother); Susannah Darwin (sister); Charles Darwin (nephew)

Josiah Wedgwood II (3 April 1769 – 12 July 1843), the son of the English potter Josiah Wedgwood, continued his father's firm and was a Member of Parliament (MP) for Stoke-upon-Trent from 1832 to 1835. He was an abolitionist, and detested slavery.

Josiah and his brother Thomas gave their friend Samuel Taylor Coleridge a life annuity of £150, with the goal of freeing Coleridge from financial worries and the need to support himself by noncreative work, so that he could pursue his literary and philosophical interests. This was offered in January 1798, and accepted by Coleridge, who was then a probationary minister in the Unitarian Church, with the condition he discontinued in the ministry.

In 1807, Wedgwood bought Maer Hall in Staffordshire and his family lived there until his death in 1843.

Wedgwood was responsible for the Wedgwood Company's first bone china wares.

== Family ==
Wedgwood married Elizabeth Allen (1764–1846) and they had four sons and five daughters, two of whom married their first cousins, the offspring of Robert Darwin and Susannah Wedgwood:

- Sarah Elizabeth Wedgwood (1793–1880)
- Josiah Wedgwood III (1795–1880); married his cousin Caroline Darwin, sister of Charles Darwin.
- Mary Anne Wedgwood (1796–1798) died as an infant.
- Charlotte Wedgwood (1797–1862); married Charles Langton (1801–1886) in 1832. After her death Charles Langton remarried her cousin Emily Catherine Darwin, daughter of Robert Darwin, sister of Charles Darwin.
- Henry Allen Wedgwood (1799–1885) married secondly his cousin Jessie Wedgwood, daughter of John Wedgwood (1766–1844).
- Francis "Frank" Wedgwood (1800–1888)
- Hensleigh Wedgwood (1803–1891)
- Frances (Fanny) Wedgwood (1806–1832)
- Emma Wedgwood (1808–1896); married her cousin Charles Darwin, son of Robert Darwin.

== References and sources ==
Parliament of the United Kingdom
New constituency	Member of Parliament for Stoke-upon-Trent; 1832 – 1835; With: John Davenport	Succeeded by John Davenport; Richard Edensor Heathcote
