= Leith Hill =

Hill in Surrey, England

Highest point
- Elevation: 294 m (965 ft)
- Prominence: 249 m (817 ft)
- Listing: Marilyn, Hardy, County Top
- Coordinates: 51°10′33″N 0°22′11″W

Geography
- Location within Surrey
- Location: Surrey, England
- Parent range: Greensand Ridge
- OS grid: TQ139431
- Topo map: OS Landranger 187

Leith Hill in southern England is the highest summit of the Greensand Ridge, approximately 6.7 km (4 mi) southwest of Dorking, Surrey and 40.5 km (25 mi) southwest of central London. It reaches 294 m (965 ft) above sea level, and is the second highest point in southeast England, after Walbury Hill in southwest Berkshire, (which is 297 m (974 ft) high). Leith Hill is the highest ground for 79 km (49 mi).

Four areas of woodland surrounding the hill comprise the 337.9-hectare (835-acre) Leith Hill Site of Special Scientific Interest, although the summit is excluded from this designation.

The nearest railway station is Holmwood station, 3.6 km (2 mi) to the east, served by Southern trains to London Victoria.

== Leith Hill Tower ==
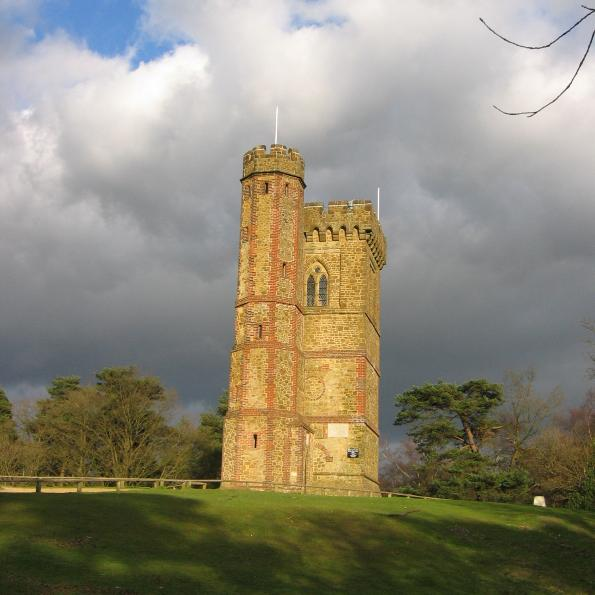
The tower on the top of Leith Hill

On the summit of Leith Hill is an 18th-century Gothic tower. In 1764–65 Richard Hull of nearby Leith Hill Place built "Prospect House", later to become known as Leith Hill Tower, with the intention of raising the hill above 1,000 ft (305 m) above sea level. A tower built contemporaneously at the summit of Bredon Hill achieves a similar purpose.

Leith Hill Tower is 19.5 metres (64 ft) high and consisted of two rooms "neatly furnished", with a Latin inscription above the door announcing that it had been built not only for his own pleasure, but also for the enjoyment of others. Hull provided visitors with prospect glasses, similar to a small telescope, through which to survey the extensive views towards London and the English Channel, each some 25 miles (40 km) away.

When Hull died in 1772, at his request he was buried under the tower. Following his death, the building was stripped of its contents, doors and windows, and fell into ruin. As a result, the tower was filled with rubble and concrete, and the entrance bricked up.

In 1864, William John Evelyn of nearby Wotton House decided to reopen it, but the concrete made this difficult, and so the additional turreted side-tower was added to allow access to the top of the tower.

At the top of the tower there is a viewpoint indicator to commemorate Walker Miles, whose work in the early days of the Rambler's movement contributed to the formation of The Ramblers of Great Britain. It has been claimed that on a clear day, 13 counties can be seen from the top of Leith Hill Tower.

The tower was fully restored by the National Trust in 1984. This restoration included the removal of rubble and concrete, fitting safety features such as a handrail in the narrow staircase, and converting the lower portion of the tower into a servery. Following restoration, the mobile phone operator Cellnet installed a first-generation transmitter station (Base site) into one of the tower rooms, feeding single vertical antennas on the tower roof dressed to look like flag poles. Leith Hill Tower is open to the public every day from 10:00 am until 3:00 pm on weekdays and 9:00 am to 5:00 pm on weekends, every day of the year except Christmas Day, with a comprehensive display explaining the history of the tower.

== History ==
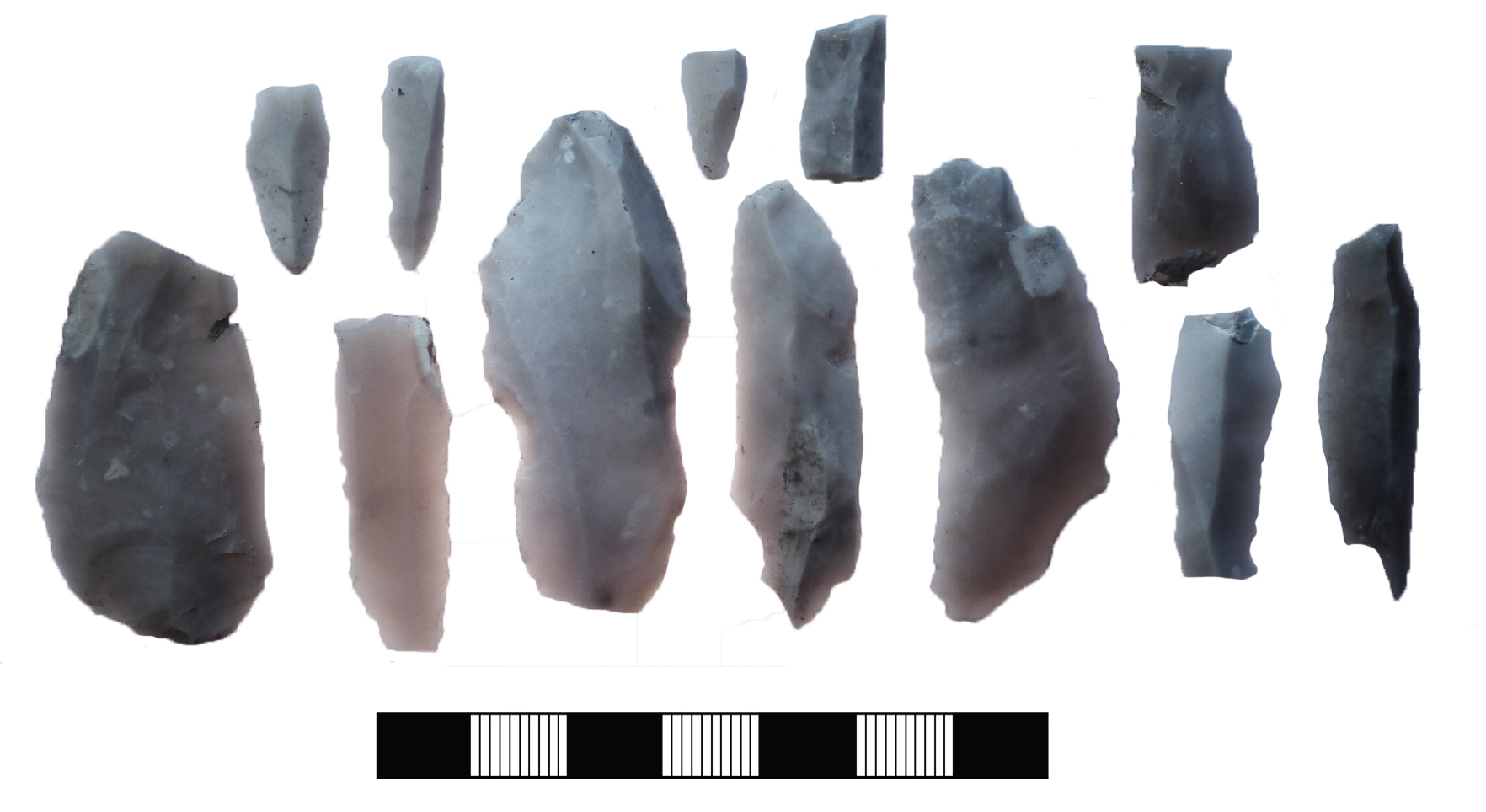
Mesolithic and/or Neolithic flint tools, found close to the summit of Leith Hill

Leith Hill was owned by the Evelyn family of Wotton House from the 17th to the early 20th centuries. On the death of Lt. John Evelyn in 1922, (Note: John H. C. Evelyn served as a lieutenant in the Argyll and Sutherland Highlanders (a British Army line infantry regiment) during World War I. He was badly injured at the Western Front and his leg was amputated in October 1918. He died on 2 January 1922.) the executors of his will were required to raise money to pay death duties and they therefore offered the Tower and the surrounding five acres of Leith Hill for sale. After a campaign, organised in part by the Commons and Footpath Preservation Society, the land was bought by Wilfred James MacAndrew (a resident of Reigate and former co-owner of the shipping company MacAndrew & Co) (Note: The MacAndrew family sold their stake in the business in June 1917. The company survives to this day as part of the French container transportation firm CMA CGM.) and donated to the National Trust.

== Leith Hill Place ==
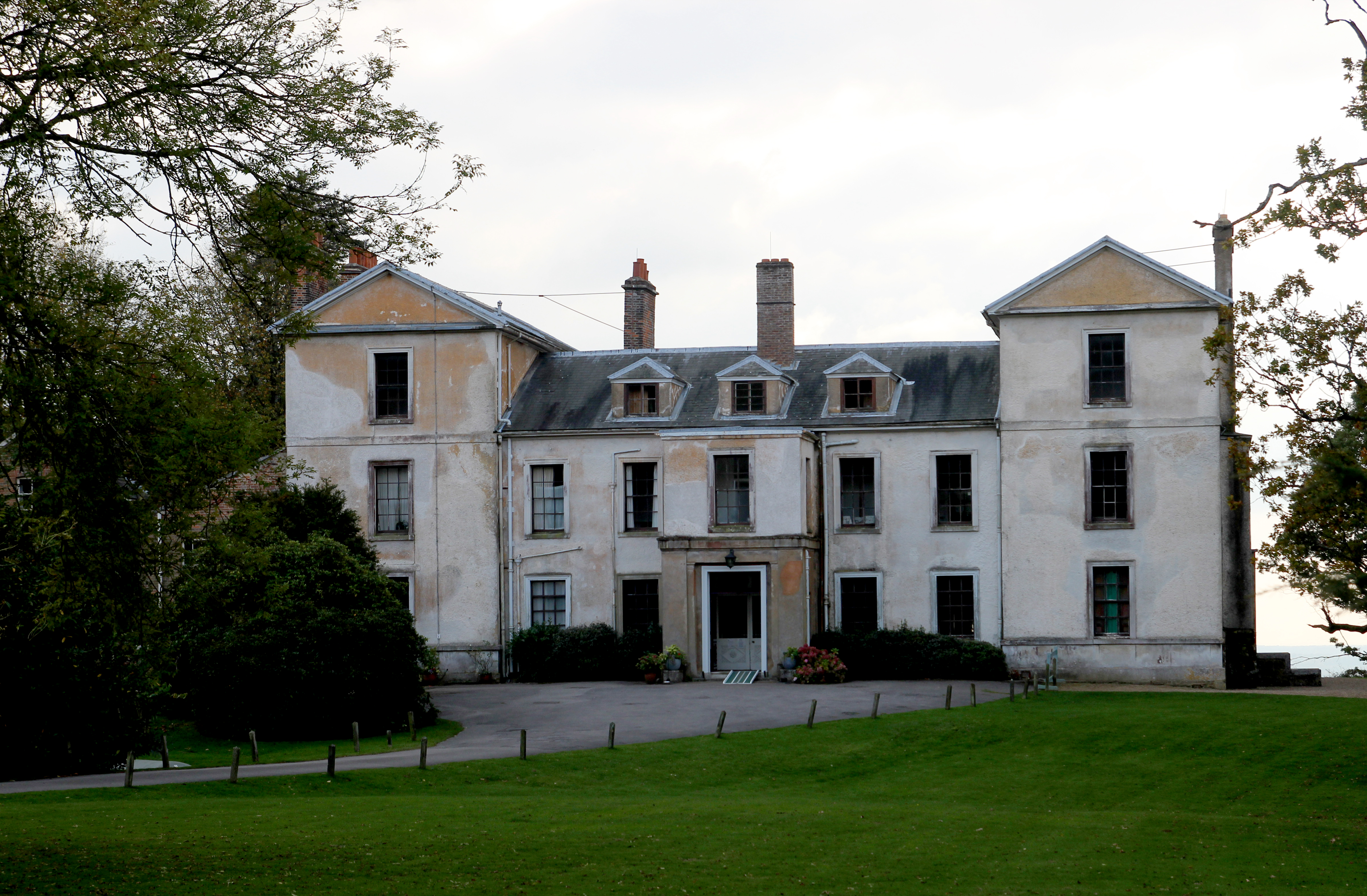
Leith Hill Place, childhood home of the composer Ralph Vaughan Williams.

Leith Hill Place, on the southern slopes of Leith Hill, was originally constructed c. 1600. Surviving original features include the Elizabethan fireplace at the west end. The house was later rebuilt in a Palladian style, although sources disagree as to whether this work was undertaken in the early 18th century for John Folliott or c. 1760 for Richard Hull. The rebuilding works included the creation of corridors on the ground and first floors, and the addition of new fireplaces in the classical style. The early Georgian staircase may have been installed at around the same time.

Leith Hill Place was bought by Josiah Wedgwood III in 1847, and the front porch was added at some point in the 19th century. Wedgwood's wife, Caroline (née Darwin), created the Rhododendron Wood and may also have planted the giant redwoods. The house remained in the Wedgwood family until Josiah and Caroline's grandson, the composer Ralph Vaughan Williams, who had been brought up there, gave it to the National Trust on his brother's death in 1944. It was subsequently leased by the trust to his cousins Sir Ralph Wedgwood and then Sir John Wedgwood, before being used for a 30-year period until 2008 as a boarding house for Hurtwood House, a sixth-form college nearby.

Leith Hill Place was opened to the public by the National Trust in 2013, and the piano on which Vaughan Williams composed The Lark Ascending was put on display three years later. The house was Grade II* listed by English Heritage in November 1966. Also listed are the sandstone gate pillars, nearby cottages built in the 17th and 18th centuries, and a 17th-century barn which forms part of Leith Hill Place Farm. The lodge was built in the Gothic style in the early 19th century for John Smallpiece.

== Geology ==
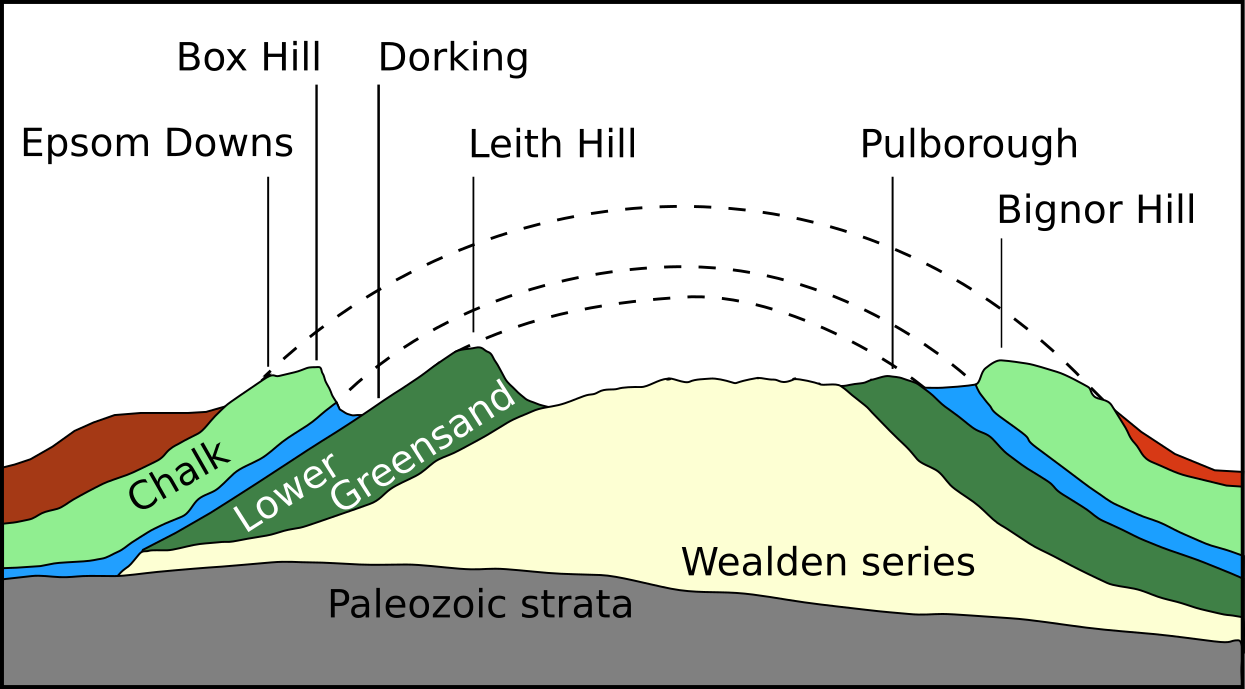
Simplified geological cross section of the western Weald, showing how the land was uplifted to form the Weald-Artois anticline (dashed lines) and the strata as they are today (solid lines).

Like the other summits of the Greensand Ridge in the south of Surrey, the rock of which Leith Hill is composed, is primarily the Lower Greensand, overlaid with a harder layer of chert. The greensand was deposited in the early Cretaceous, most likely in a shallow sea with low oxygen levels. Over the subsequent 50 million years, other strata were deposited on top of the Lower Greensand, including Gault clay and the chalk of the North and South Downs.

Following the Cretaceous, the sea covering the south of England began to retreat and the land was pushed higher. The Weald (the area covering modern-day south Surrey, south Kent, north Sussex and east Hampshire) was lifted by the same geological processes that created the Alps, resulting in an anticline which stretched across the English Channel to the Artois region of northern France. Initially an island, this dome-like structure was drained by the ancestors of the rivers which today cut through the North and South Downs (including the Mole, Wey and Arun). (Note: Leith Hill forms the watershed between the Mole (to the north east), the Wey (to the north west), and the Arun (to the south).) The dome was eroded away over the course of the Cenozoic, exposing the strata beneath and resulting in the escarpments of the Downs and the Greensand Ridge.

== Search for oil ==
A site on an ancient lane going up the hill was originally chosen by an oil company for exploratory drilling, however due to an active protest campaign and various legal objections raised by local groups and environmentalists, the lease on the land from the Forestry Commission expired before the drilling could start. The Minister for Environment subsequently decided not to renew the lease due to concerns of the effect it would have on nearby ancient woodland. The oil company has since stated it intends to find a new site from which to explore the same prospect. Locals have stated that they will continue to oppose this.

== Geodesy ==
Leith Hill Tower was the origin (meridian) of the 6 inch and 1:2500 Ordnance Survey maps of Surrey.
