= John Wedgwood (horticulturist) =

British horticulturist (1766–1844)

- Born: 1766; Etruria, Staffordshire, England
- Died: 26 January 1844 (aged 77–78); Tenby, Pembrokeshire
- Education: Warrington Academy; University of Edinburgh
- Spouse: Louisa Jane Allen (m. 1794)
- Children: 6
- Parent(s): Josiah Wedgwood; Sarah Wedgwood
- Family: Darwin–Wedgwood family

John Wedgwood (baptised 2 April 1766 – 26 January 1844), the eldest son of the potter Josiah Wedgwood, was a partner in the Wedgwood pottery firm 1790–1793 and again 1800–1812.

== Life ==
Wedgwood was educated at Warrington Academy and the University of Edinburgh. Wedgwood had an interest in botany and horticulture, particularly the cultivation of tropical fruit and other exotic plants. He was a founder of the Royal Horticultural Society having suggested the idea in a letter to William Forsyth, head gardener to King George III, written 29 June 1801 and chairing the first meeting of the society on 7 March 1804. He lived at Cote House in Westbury-on-Trym, Bristol , and at Kingscote, Gloucestershire.

He was a partner in the Davison and Co. bank in Pall Mall. The Bank failed in 1816, after which time he retired.

Wedgwood married Louisa Jane Allen (younger sister of his brother Josiah Wedgwood II's wife, Elizabeth "Bessie" Allen) in 1794. He died in Tenby, Pembrokeshire, in 1844, having had six children, one of whom died young:

- Col. Thomas Josiah Wedgwood (1797–1860), married Anne, daughter of Admiral Sir Charles Tyler but they had no children. Fought at the Battle of Waterloo.
- Charles Wedgwood (1800–c.1823)
- Jessie Wedgwood (1804–1872) married her double cousin Henry Allen Wedgwood, son of Josiah Wedgwood II and Elizabeth Allen. They had six children.
- The Rev. Robert Wedgwood, (1806–1881) Rector of Dumbleton, Gloucestershire.
- The Rev. John Allen Wedgwood (1796–1862) Rector of Maer, Staffordshire.
- Sarah Elizabeth Wedgwood (1795–1857)
