= Erasmus Alvey Darwin =

Elder brother of Charles Darwin (1804–1881)

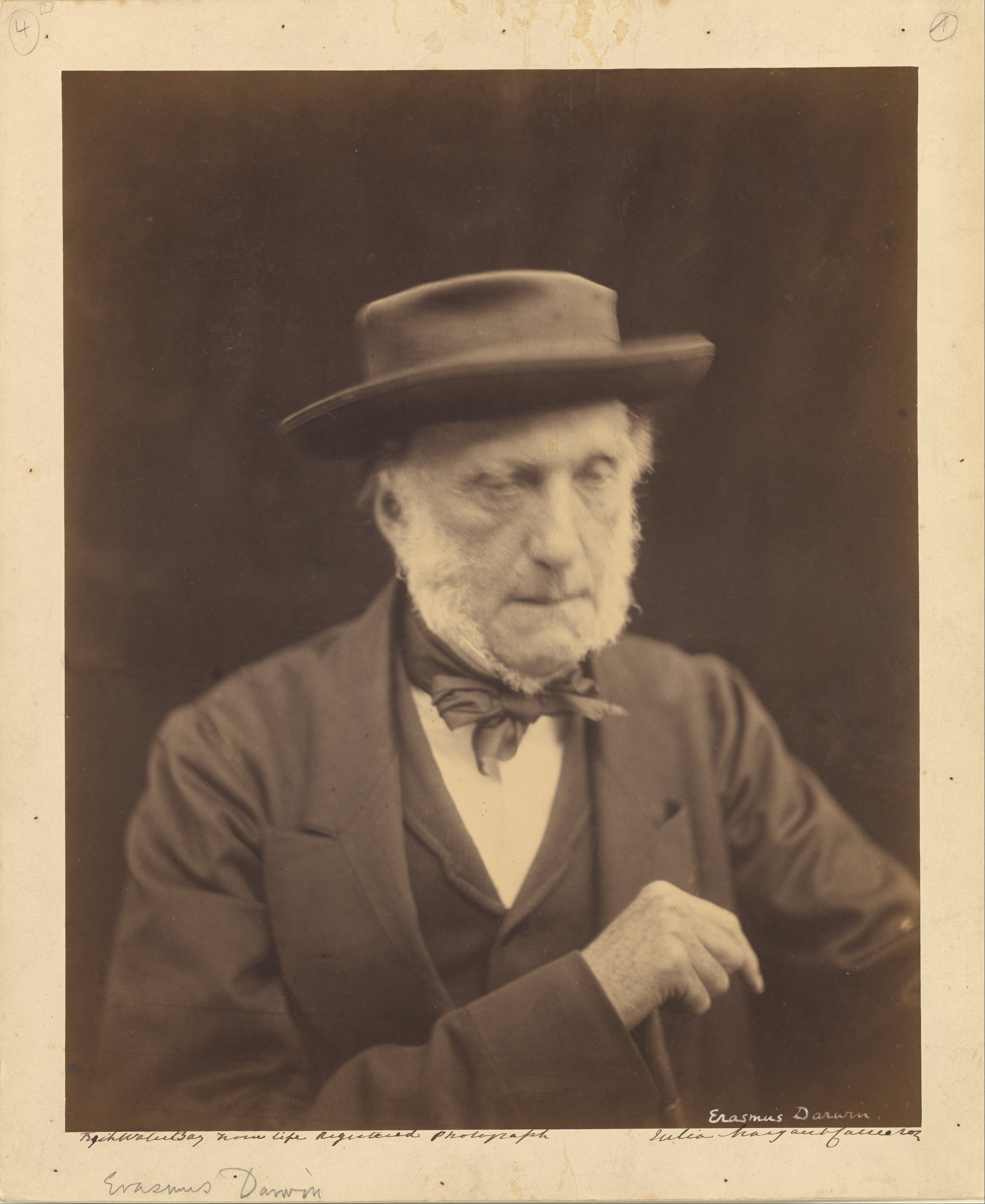
- Portrait of Erasmus Darwin by Julia Margaret Cameron in 1868.
- Born: Erasmus Alvey Darwin; 29 December 1804; Shrewsbury, Shropshire, England
- Died: 26 August 1881 (aged 76); London
- Other name: Eras or Ras
- Education: Shrewsbury School
- Known for: brother of Charles Darwin
- Parent(s): Robert Darwin; Susannah Wedgwood
- Relatives: See Darwin–Wedgwood family

Erasmus Alvey Darwin (29 December 1804 – 26 August 1881), nicknamed Eras or Ras, was the older brother of Charles Darwin, born five years earlier. They were brought up at the family home, The Mount House, Shrewsbury, Shropshire, England. He was the only other son besides Charles, the fourth of six children of Susannah (née Wedgwood) and Robert Darwin, and the grandson of Erasmus Darwin and of Josiah Wedgwood, a family of the Unitarian church. He was a member of the semi-secretive Cambridge Apostles society, a debating club largely reserved for the brightest students.

== Education ==
He was educated at Shrewsbury School between 1815–1822 as a boarder, and as a frail and studious boy his interest was in books and plants rather than friends. His mother died in 1817 and he was joined at the school by his brother Charles in September 1818. Darwin became bored with the classical curriculum and took an interest in chemistry, with Charles as his assistant. They had a garden shed at their home fitted out as a laboratory.

In 1822 Erasmus went on to a medical course at Christ's College, Cambridge, where he studied Chemistry under Professor James Cumming. When it came to be time for his one-year external hospital study in 1825 he went to the University of Edinburgh, accompanying his younger brother who was just starting a course there in medicine. They planned ahead, Erasmus thinking "It will be very pleasant our being together, we shall be as cozy as possible", arriving early at Edinburgh to make social contact with old friends of the family in Whig society, and so "we can both read like horses". Erasmus enrolled with John Lizars, a "charming" and respectable surgeon on the other side of Surgeon's Square from his chief rival as a private tutor, the flamboyant Robert Knox who two years later became embroiled with the body-snatchers Burke and Hare. Near the end of March, Erasmus finished his hospital study, leaving Charles behind, and enrolled in a London anatomy school.

By 1828 Erasmus was ready to sit his Bachelor of Medicine exam at the University of Cambridge, and early in the new year he was accompanied to Cambridge by his brother Charles who had given up on medical studies and was now starting a course to qualify as a clergyman. That summer he went on a Continental tour to Munich, Milan and Vienna, and on his return home during the Christmas holiday he and Charles visited London, touring the scientific institutions.

== Retirement ==
In the summer of 1829, he gave up medicine as his father Doctor Robert Waring Darwin considered that Erasmus's "delicate frame" could not withstand a career "involving, if successful, a severe strain on body & mind" and decided to pension him off. Eras was "very agreeable" to retiring at the age of 26 and planned to live in London with "an air cushion in his rooms" to allow a visiting Charles to stay with him. The brothers visited the Birmingham Music Festival for what Charles described as the "most glorious" experience. That Christmas Charles visited Eras in London for three weeks, making use of the air-bed, then again at Easter 1831 before "geologis" in Wales, but as Erasmus was out of town when the opportunity to join the Voyage of the Beagle came up, Charles took lodgings in London to make his arrangements. The departure was delayed, and Erasmus visited Plymouth for a few days to be shown round HMS Beagle by Charles. He was still on board on the morning of 10 December to say his farewells just before she set out.

In 1833 Erasmus was close companions with Fanny Wedgwood, Hensleigh Wedgwood's wife (whom the family called Fanny Hensleigh as there were so many women named Fanny in the family), and was also close to Emma Wedgwood, as noted by his sister Catherine in a letter to their brother Charles Darwin during his long voyage on The Beagle:

He seems to be more in love than ever with Fanny Hensleigh, and almost lives at Clapham. Papa has long been alarmed for the consequences, & expects to see an action in the Papers. I think the real danger is with Emma Wedgwood, who I suspect Mr Erasmus to be more in love with, than appears, or than perhaps he knows himself.

Erasmus may also have proposed to Emma Wedgwood during this period. Emma later married Charles, becoming Emma Darwin.

== Harriet Martineau ==
In May 1834 Charles got a letter from his sisters recommending Poor Laws and Paupers Illustrated in pamphlet-sized parts by the fiercely independent literary Whig Harriet Martineau, and telling him that "Erasmus knows her & is a very great admirer & everybody reads her little books & if you have a dull hour you can, and then throw them overboard, that they may not take up your precious room".

In October 1836 after Charles returned from the voyage he stayed with his brother in a bustling London, where Erasmus enjoyed a life of literary leisure, his week revolving around intellectual dinner parties, spending his days with Miss Martineau. Their father was concerned that her radicalism made her unsuitable as a daughter-in-law, and possibly a bad influence on his boys. Charles wrote that "Erasmus is just returned from driving out Miss Martineau.— Our only protection from so admirable a sister-in-law is in her working him too hard. He begins to perceive, (to use his own expression) he shall be not much better than her 'nigger'.— Imagine poor Erasmus a nigger to so philosophical & energetic a lady.— How pale & woe begone he will look.— She already takes him to task about his idleness— She is going some day to explain to him her notions about marriage— Perfect equality of rights is part of her doctrine. I much doubt whether it will be equality in practice. We must pray for our poor 'nigger'." In December Charles called on Martineau and remarked that "She was very agreeable and managed to talk on a most wonderful number of subjects, considering the limited time. I was astonished to find how little ugly she is, but as it appears to me, she is overwhelmed with her own projects, her own thoughts and own abilities. Erasmus palliated all this, by maintaining one ought not to look at her as a woman."

Eras had a cosmopolitan circle of friends including Martineau and his relative Hensleigh Wedgwood, and arranged intimate dinner parties with guests such as Charles Lyell, Charles Babbage and Thomas Carlyle. Radical and dissenting "heterodoxy was the norm". In the Spring of 1837, Charles moved to nearby lodgings where he could readily visit and attend Eras's dinner parties.

In April 1838 Charles told his older sister Susan that he had seen the rhinoceros in the zoo let out for the first time that spring, "kicking & rearing" and galloping for joy. He then passed on the gossip that Miss Martineau had been "as frisky lately [as] the Rhinoceros.— Erasmus has been with her noon, morning, and night:—if her character was not as secure, as a mountain in the polar regions she certainly would loose it.— Lyell called there the other day & there was a beautiful rose on the table, & she coolly showed it to him & said “Erasmus Darwin” gave me that.— How fortunate it is, she is so very plain; otherwise I should be frightened: She is a wonderful woman".

Before marrying at the start of 1839 Charles moved to Gower Street, London, astounding Erasmus with the amount of his luggage. In the summer of that year Martineau's health broke down during a visit to the Continent and, fearing a tumour she retired to solitary lodgings in Tynemouth near her brother. She and Erasmus remained on good terms, writing to each other. Erasmus's social circle drifted apart, while "[Eras] sticks to his opium with many groans". (Opium was a common medicine at this time.)

== "Uncle Ras" ==
While Charles Darwin's illness made him increasingly reclusive after his move to Downe, he would still visit Erasmus as one of his relatives and friends who provided safe havens. One such occasion was the Great Exhibition in 1851 when the family came to London and stayed with "Uncle Ras". By 1852 Erasmus had become a confirmed bachelor, languid and melancholic, living alone except for servants, but at parties, his "playful wit" made him the universal solvent. That summer he stayed at Down House with the family and delighted his nephews and nieces whom he loved dearly, and who adored him. He romped with them, getting down on his hands and knees and becoming their playmate.

As the reaction to Darwin's theory began following the publication of On the Origin of Species at the end of 1859, Erasmus thought it "the most interesting book I have ever read", and sent a copy to his old flame Harriet Martineau who at 58 was still reviewing from her home in the Lake District. In 1863 he was on the Council of the abolitionist Ethnological Society of London which at the time of the American Civil War was engaged in debate with the breakaway pro-slavery Anthropological Society.

Francis Galton, having caught the fad for Spiritualism, arranged a séance in January 1874 at Erasmus's house with those attending including Charles, Hensleigh Wedgwood and Thomas Huxley. Charles's son George hired the medium Charles Williams, and they sat round the table in the dark, though Charles left to lie down, missing the show. It "took away all their breaths" with a ringing bell, rushing wind, jumping candlestick and the table rising up above their heads. Galton thought it a "good séance" and Erasmus dabbled in "spirit photographs", but Charles remained convinced that it was "all imposture", as Huxley and George proved at a second séance.

By the autumn of 1880 Erasmus was in poor health, suffering from the effects of time and opium, in constant pain and scarcely able to leave home. In September 1880 Charles stayed with Erasmus while his portrait was painted by John Collier. Shortly afterwards, Erasmus became gravely ill and died quietly on 26 August. Emma Darwin broke the news to Charles, who commented that he had seen Erasmus dying slowly "for many years", not "a happy man" but always kindhearted, clearheaded and affectionate. The funeral at Downe on 1 September was taken by their cousin John Allen Wedgwood, now 85, who had officiated at the wedding of Charles and Emma. Charles, looking "old and ill" in a long black funeral cloak, was a picture of "sad reverie" as the coffin was lowered. A marble slab was arranged, with words by Thomas Carlyle: "one of the sincerest, truest and most modest of men".

He is buried in St Mary the Virgin Churchyard, Downe, Kent.
