= Leith Hill SSSI =

Protected area in Surrey, England

Coordinates: 51.185°N 0.379°W

Leith Hill
- Site of Special Scientific Interest
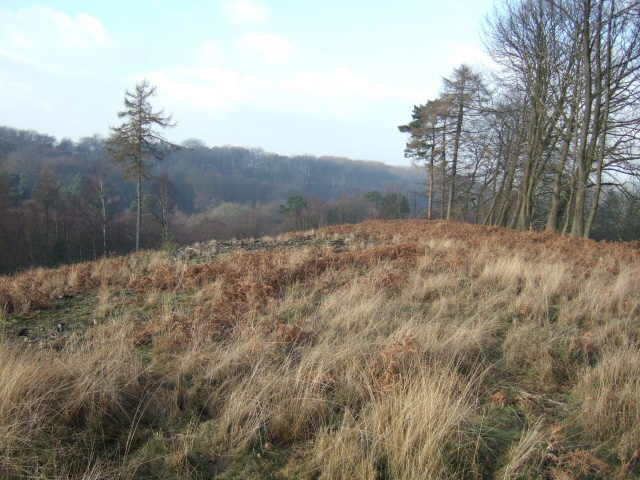
- Location of Leith Hill.
- Area of search: Surrey
- Grid reference: TQ 134 441
- Interest: Biological
- Area: 337.9 hectares (835 acres)
- Notification date: 1991
- Location map: Magic Map

Leith Hill SSSI is a 337.9-hectare (835-acre) biological Site of Special Scientific Interest south-east of Dorking in Surrey. The SSSI consists of four wooded areas surrounding Leith Hill.

These woods support diverse breeding birds, including all three species of British woodpeckers. The invertebrate population is outstanding, with many nationally rare and uncommon species, such as the beetles Notolaemus unifasciatus, which is found on dead wood, Silvanus bidentatus, which feeds on fungus, and the water beetle Agabus melanarius. There are two nationally rare moths.
