= Henry Allen Wedgwood =

English barrister (1799–1885)

- Born: 4 April 1799
- Died: 17 October 1885 (aged 86)
- Occupation: Barrister
- Spouse: Jessie Wedgwood
- Children: 6
- Parent(s): Josiah Wedgwood II; Elizabeth Allen
- Family: Darwin–Wedgwood family

Henry Allen Wedgwood (4 April 1799 – 17 October 1885) was an English barrister.

== Life ==
Wedgwood was the third child and second son of Josiah Wedgwood II and his wife Elizabeth Allen. He was a grandson of the illustrious potter Josiah Wedgwood and a brother-in-law of the naturalist Charles Darwin.

He married Jessie Wedgwood on 14 September 1830 at Abergavenny. Jessie was his double first cousin, the daughter of John Wedgwood and his wife Louisa Jane Allen. Henry and Jessie had six children:

- Louisa Frances Wedgwood Kempson (b.1834)
- Caroline Elizabeth Wedgwood (b.1836)
- John Darwin Wedgwood (b.1840)
- Anne Jane Wedgwood (b.1841)
- Arthur Wedgwood (b.1843)
- Rowland Henry Wedgwood (b.1847).

He authored the children's book The Bird Talisman: An Eastern Tale. Some editions were illustrated by his cousin twice removed Gwen Raverat.
