= Susannah Darwin =

Mother of Charles Darwin

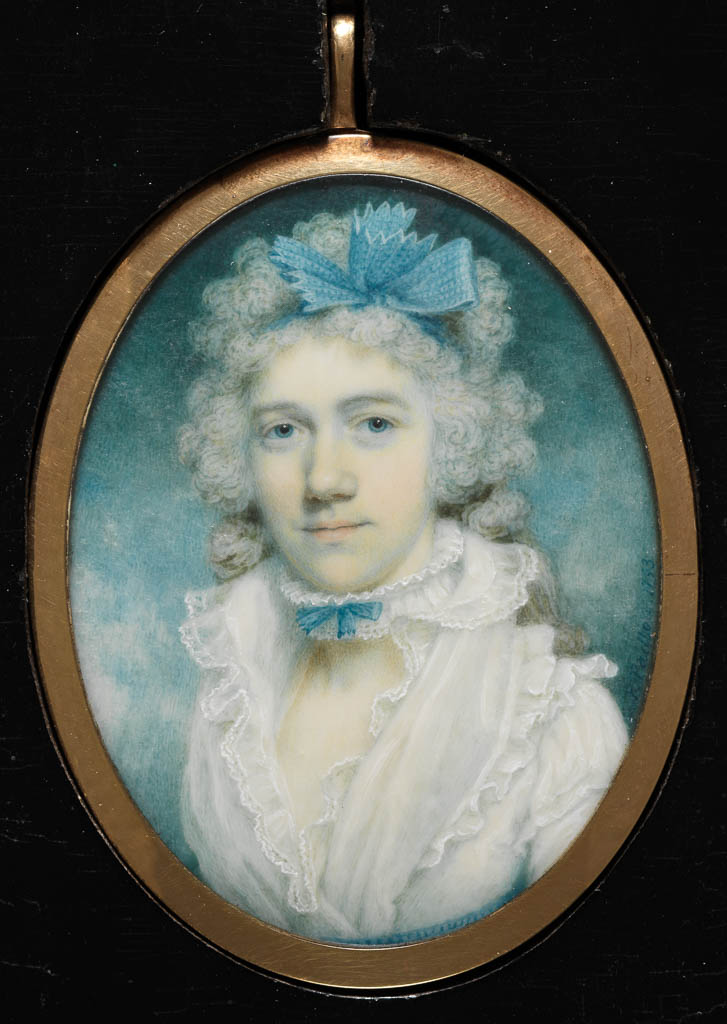
- Susannah Darwin by Peter Paillou (the Younger), watercolour painted on ivory, 1793.
- Born: Susannah Wedgwood; 3 January 1765; Etruria, Staffordshire, England
- Died: 15 July 1817 (aged 52); Shrewsbury, England
- Known for: Mother of Charles Darwin
- Spouse: Robert Darwin (m. 1796)
- Children: 6, including Charles Darwin, Caroline Wedgwood, Erasmus Alvey Darwin
- Parent: Josiah Wedgwood (father)
- Family: Darwin–Wedgwood family

Susannah Darwin (née Wedgwood, 3 January 1765 – 15 July 1817) was the wife of Robert Darwin, a wealthy medical doctor, and mother of naturalist Charles Darwin, and part of the Wedgwood pottery family.

== Biography ==
=== Early life ===
Susannah Wedgwood was the daughter of Josiah and Sarah Wedgwood and grew up at Etruria Hall, the Wedgwood family home in Stoke on Trent (completed in 1771). Josiah Wedgwood's business was already successful and expanding when she was born, and she grew up in increasingly comfortable circumstances. She was the oldest of the Wedgwood's eight children, known as "Sukey" within the family. Her baptism in January 1765, at home because of bad weather, was followed by a lobster dinner, with port, for the family, though as a sign of things to come, her father had to leave early to deal with business matters.

At the age of seven, she was sent to a boarding school in Manchester but returned home for the summer holidays "full of pouks, & boils & humours", according to a letter by her father, so was taken to the spa at Buxton to recover, and thereafter tutored at home, with occasional visits to London to stay with her father's friend and business partner Thomas Bentley.

=== Marriage to Robert Darwin ===
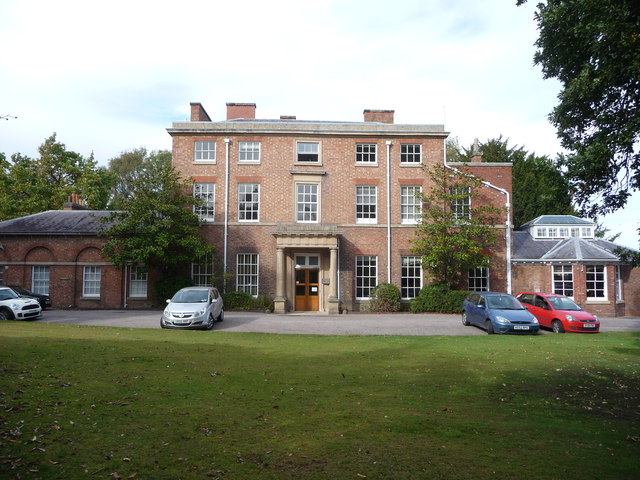
The Mount, Shrewsbury, home from 1800.

Erasmus Darwin, father of Robert Darwin, had long been a friend of Josiah, and she had known the family since childhood, at one point giving Erasmus Junior music lessons (she was an accomplished harpsichordist). Robert and Susannah became engaged in 1794, at the ages of 29 and 28 respectively. They did not marry until 18 April 1796, by which time Robert's medical practice in Shrewsbury was well-established. Josiah had died in January 1795, leaving his daughter £25,000, a very considerable sum at the time. Despite the families living in the Midlands, the marriage was at St Marylebone, Middlesex, even then part of London. This was not the present St Marylebone Parish Church, not built until 1813, but what is now called St Peter, Vere Street, appropriately very near Harley Street.

From 1800, when it was completed, the family lived at The Mount, Shrewsbury, which still stands. She gave birth to Charles Darwin, the fifth of her six children, on 12 February 1809.

=== Death ===
In 1817, she started growing ill, with gastrointestinal symptoms that were probably a sign of either a severe ulcer or stomach cancer. She died on 15 July 1817 aged 52. She, her husband, and their daughter Susan are buried at St Chad's Church, Montford, Shropshire (not to be confused with St Chad's, Shrewsbury).

== Children ==
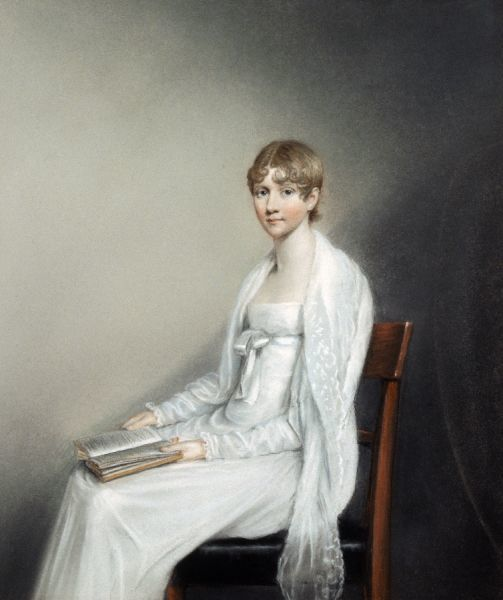
Susannah Darwin's daughter Caroline Darwin, aged 16, 1816

- Marianne Darwin (1798–1858), married Henry Parker (1788–1858) in 1824.
- Caroline Sarah Darwin (1800–1888) married her cousin Josiah Wedgwood III
- Susan Elizabeth Darwin (1803–1866), unmarried.
- Erasmus Alvey Darwin (1804–1881)
- Charles Robert Darwin (1809–1882)
- Emily Catherine Darwin (1810–1866), married 1863, Charles Langton clergyman and widower of her cousin Charlotte Wedgwood.
