= The Mount, Shrewsbury =

Georgian house in Shrewsbury, England

Coordinates: 52°42′46.00″N 02°45′47.50″W

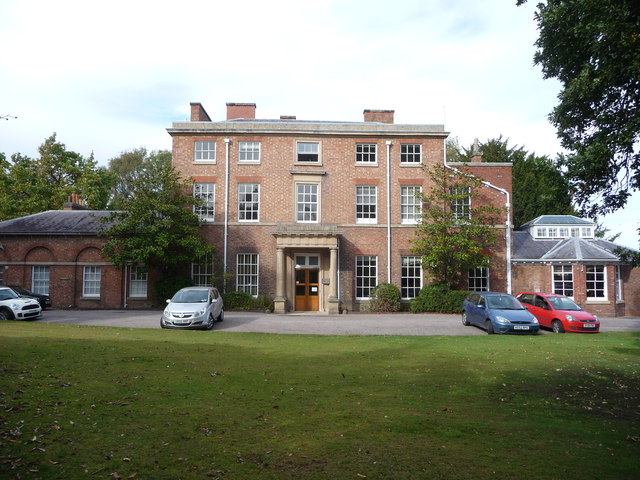
The Mount

The Mount is the Georgian house in Shrewsbury, England where Charles Darwin was born.

== Overview ==
The large Georgian house was built in 1800 by Charles Darwin's father, the successful local doctor Robert Darwin. His son Charles was born there on 12 February 1809. Robert Darwin died in the house on 13 November 1848, followed by his unmarried daughters Catherine and Susan. Since there were no surviving members of the Darwin family in residence, the house was then put up for auction, after the three surviving Darwin children, Ras, Charles, and Caroline Wedgwood had taken what possessions they wished.

As of 2004, the house is occupied by the District Valuer and Valuation Office of Shrewsbury, and visits may be made by appointment during office hours. The building is grade II* listed. The site is not recognized as a museum. However, Down House, in Bromley (London), where Darwin spent most of his adult life, is a museum.

In January 2018, a steering group was established by the Mayor of Shrewsbury, Councillor Jane Mackenzie, and led by Shrewsbury Town Council. Their purpose was to acquire Mount House and take it into public ownership, so that a visitor destination could be developed where Darwin's contribution to science could be celebrated.

== Architecture ==
It is a building of the typical Georgian style, showing influences over the neoclassic movement. Built of local red brick, it has five bays. The central bay above the portico has a prominent window surround. The portico is large with a thick stone cornice and two doric pillars. All windows are sash windows and have brick surrounds. The house is composed of three stories that can be seen from the outside, with the smaller attic story at the top. There is a low-pitched roof with no dormers and a simple stone cornice in-between the roof and the bricks.

== See also ==
- Mountfields, Shrewsbury, adjacent area of the town
