= Robert Darwin =

English medical doctor (1766–1848)

Robert Darwin FRS
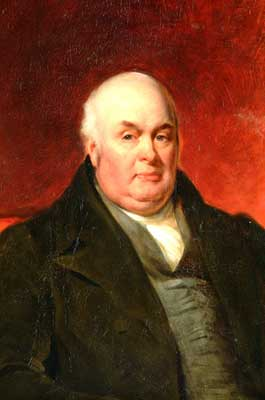
- Robert Darwin, from an oil painting by James Pardon (1811–1829)
- Born: Robert Waring Darwin; 30 May 1766; Lichfield, Staffordshire, England
- Died: 13 November 1848 (aged 82); Shrewsbury, England
- Burial place: St Chad's Church, Montford, Shropshire
- Education: Leiden University
- Occupation: Medical doctor
- Spouse: Susannah Wedgwood (m. 1796; died 1817)
- Children: Marianne Parker; Caroline Wedgwood; Susan Darwin; Erasmus Alvey Darwin; Charles Darwin; Emily Langton
- Parent(s): Erasmus Darwin; Mary Howard
- Relatives: See Darwin–Wedgwood family

Robert Waring Darwin FRS (30 May 1766 – 13 November 1848) was an English medical doctor who is today best known as the father of naturalist Charles Darwin. He was a member of the influential Darwin–Wedgwood family.

== Biography ==
Darwin was born in Lichfield, the son of physician Erasmus Darwin and his first wife, Mary Howard. He was named after his uncle, Robert Waring Darwin of Elston (1724–1816), a bachelor. His mother died in 1770 and Mary Parker, the governess hired to look after him, became his father's mistress and bore Erasmus two illegitimate daughters.

In 1783, Darwin began his studies of medicine at the University of Edinburgh, where he apparently took lodgings with the chemistry professor Joseph Black. His father then sent him to the Leiden University in the Netherlands for a few months, and he took his MD there on 26 February 1785. His Leyden dissertation was impressive and was published in the Philosophical Transactions, but his father may have assisted him in this. In Edinburgh Robert Darwin had studied under several leading scholars, including John Walker. He was elected a Fellow of the Royal Society on 21 February 1788.

=== Career ===
In 1787, when he was still under 21 years old, Darwin set up practice in Shrewsbury, the county town of Shropshire. The family story was that he was brought there by his father who gave him £20, saying, "Let me know when you want more, and I will send it you", then sent another £20 by his uncle, and that was all he needed. A tall and then slim young man, he gained attention when the wife of a bookseller in Wellington, who was being treated for illness by a doctor from the county hospital, fell dangerously ill while that doctor was away for several days on business. Darwin was called in, and as the apothecary would give no information, had to decide on treatment himself. She died, and there was a controversy about which doctor was to blame. Darwin hastily published a pamphlet showing that the other doctor had been treating her for a disease which she did not have, and while his reputation was gained, the other doctor moved elsewhere. After only six months, Darwin "already had between forty and fifty patients", and within two years had a large practice. For two or three years he lived on St. John's Hill, then moved to The Crescent. For years afterwards Darwin, regretting the hasty way the pamphlet had been written, bought up all copies and burnt them.

With small inheritances from his mother and an aunt, Darwin invested in housing, buying the freehold of several buildings in Shrewsbury and getting income from rents. He became a major stockholder in the Trent and Mersey Canal, and an investor in the London to Holyhead road built by Thomas Telford as another part of the infrastructure of the Industrial Revolution.

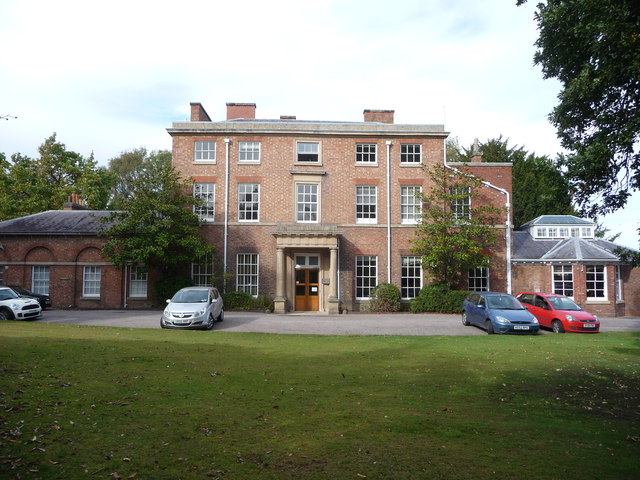
The Mount, Shrewsbury

Erasmus Darwin reached an understanding with his close friend Josiah Wedgwood that his son Robert would marry Wedgwood's favourite daughter, Susannah, when able to support her. Josiah died in January 1795, leaving £25,000 to Susannah. By then Robert Darwin was well established, and they married on 18 April 1796. Their first child, Marianne, was born at The Crescent. Robert Darwin purchased land overlooking the River Severn and had a large red-brick house built there around 1800 which was named The Mount, where all their other children were born. He took great pleasure in the large garden, and had it planted out with ornamental trees and shrubs as well as having particular success in growing fruit-trees.

A large man of 6 ft 2 in (1.88 m), he reportedly stopped weighing himself when he weighed 24 stone (336 lb, 153 kg). He required his coachman to test the floorboards of houses he was visiting, and had to have special stone steps made for him to enter his carriage.

He held his experience in Edinburgh in such high regard that he sent his son Charles to study there. He at first refused to let his son join the survey voyage of HMS Beagle, but was persuaded otherwise.

== Scientific contributions ==
Robert Darwin provided the first empirical evidence that small eye movements are made even when people attempt to keep them fixed. This he found during his studies of the afterimages of colored stimuli in which he noticed that while a person tried to fixate a colored circle, a lucid edge appeared on the adjacent white-paper background. He concluded "as by the unsteadiness of the eye a part of the fatigued retina falls on the white paper".

== Family ==
On 18 April 1796 he married Susannah Wedgwood, daughter of the pottery manufacturer Josiah Wedgwood, at St Marylebone, Middlesex (now part of London), and they had six children:

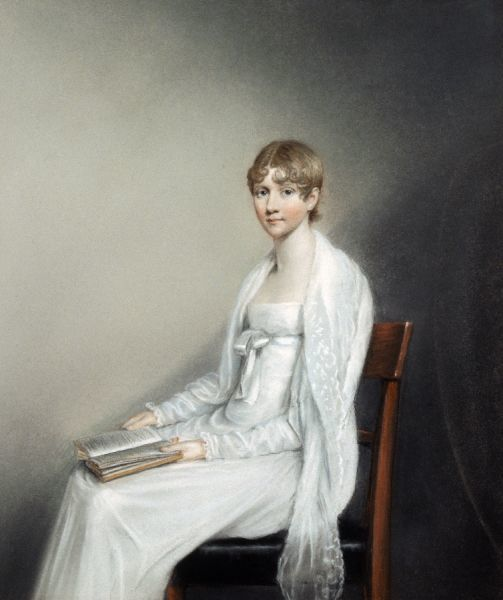
Susannah Darwin's daughter Caroline Darwin, aged 16, 1816

- Marianne Darwin (1798–1858), married Henry Parker (1788–1858) in 1824.
- Caroline Sarah Darwin (1800–1888) married her cousin Josiah Wedgwood III
- Susan Elizabeth Darwin (1803–1866), unmarried.
- Erasmus Alvey Darwin (1804–1881)
- Charles Robert Darwin (1809–1882)
- Emily Catherine Darwin (1810–1866), married 1863, Charles Langton clergyman and widower of her cousin Charlotte Wedgwood.

He, his wife, and their daughter Susan are buried in St Chad's Church, Montford, near Shrewsbury.
