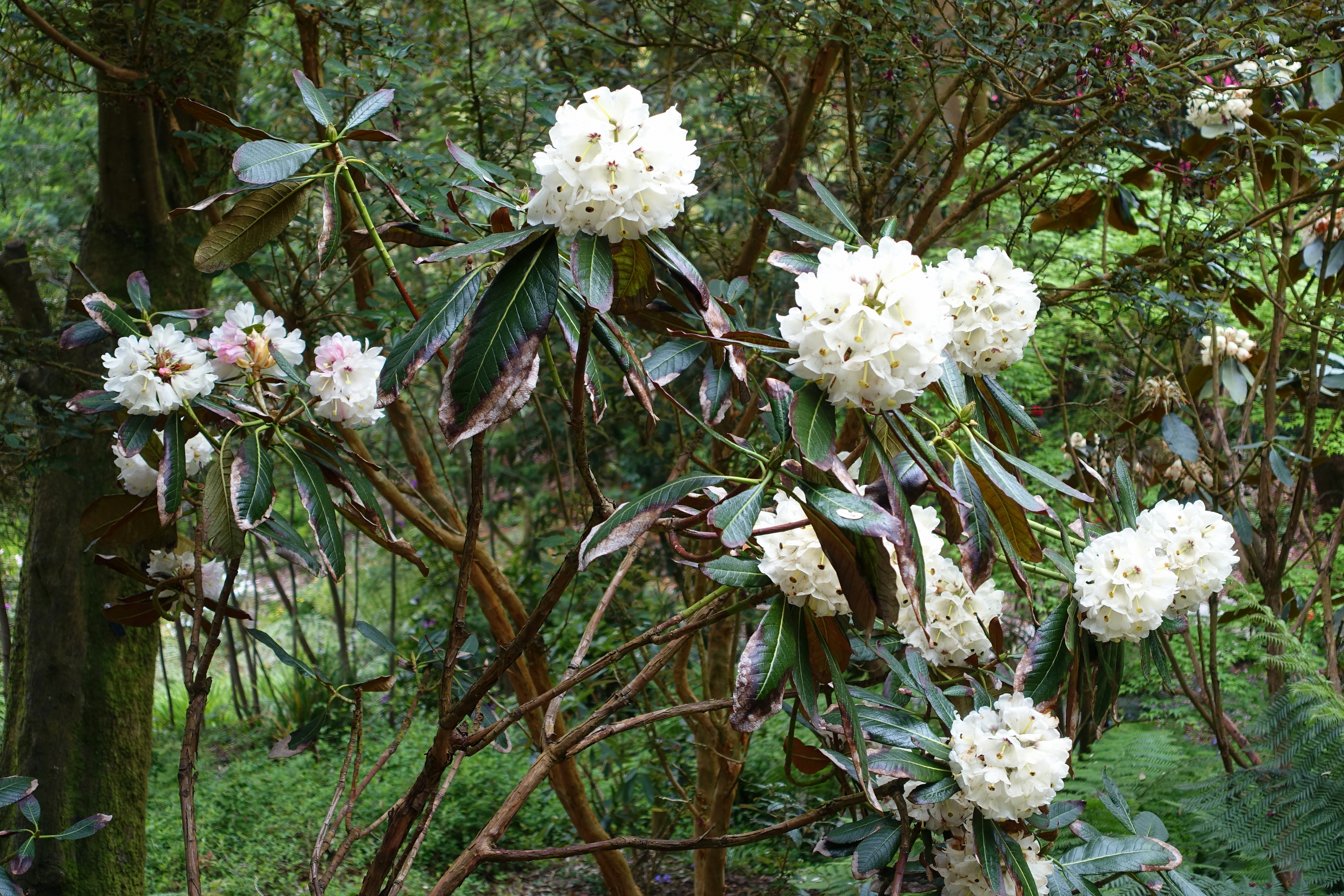

Scientific classification
- Kingdom: Plantae
- Clade: Tracheophytes
- Clade: Angiosperms
- Clade: Eudicots
- Clade: Asterids
- Order: Ericales
- Family: Ericaceae
- Genus: Rhododendron
- Species: R. falconeri

Binomial name
- Rhododendron falconeri Hook.f.

Synonyms
- Azalea falconeri (Hook.f.) Kuntze

= Rhododendron falconeri =

Species of flowering shrub or tree

Rhododendron falconeri, the falconer rhododendron, is a species of flowering plant in the family Ericaceae, native to the eastern Himalayas. It is a large evergreen shrub or tree, and sometimes the dominant canopy tree, that typically grows to 12–15 m (39–49 ft) in height, with leathery leaves that are elliptic to obovate in shape and usually about 1 ft (0.30 m) in length. Flowers are white to cream, pale yellow, or pinkish, with a prominent purple blotch.

It occurs from eastern Nepal through Sikkim and Bhutan, as well as adjacent areas of northeastern India (Arunachal Pradesh and West Bengal). It grows at altitudes of 2,700–3,750 m (8,860–12,300 ft).

In cultivation in the UK, Rhododendron falconeri has gained the Royal Horticultural Society's Award of Garden Merit. It is hardy down to −10 °C (14 °F) but requires a sheltered position. Like most rhododendrons it needs an acid soil that is rich in leaf mould.
