= Charles Darwin's education =

Charles Darwin's education gave him a foundation in the doctrine of Creation prevalent throughout the Western world at the time, as well as knowledge of medicine and theology. More significantly, it led to his interest in natural history, which culminated in his taking part in the second voyage of HMS Beagle and the eventual inception of his theory of natural selection. Although Darwin changed his field of interest several times in these formative years, many of his later discoveries and beliefs were foreshadowed by the influences he had as a youth.

== Background and influences ==
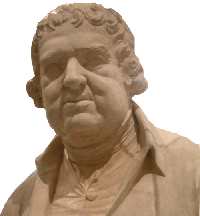
Erasmus Darwin, Charles Darwin's paternal grandfather, helped influence Darwin's later religious views.

A child of the early 19th century, Charles Robert Darwin grew up in a conservative era when repression of revolutionary Radicalism had displaced the 18th century Enlightenment. The Church of England dominated the English scientific establishment. The Church saw natural history as revealing God's underlying plan and as supporting the existing social hierarchy. It rejected Enlightenment philosophers such as David Hume who had argued for naturalism and against belief in God.

The discovery of fossils of extinct species was explained by theories such as catastrophism. Catastrophism claimed that animals and plants were periodically annihilated as a result of natural catastrophes and then replaced by new species created ex nihilo (out of nothing). The extinct organisms could then be observed in the fossil record, and their replacements were considered to be immutable.

Darwin's extended family of Darwins and Wedgwoods was strongly Unitarian. One of Darwin's grandfathers, Erasmus Darwin, was a successful physician, and was followed in this by his sons Charles Darwin, who died in 1778 while still a promising medical student at the University of Edinburgh, and Doctor Robert Waring Darwin, Darwin's father, who named his son Charles Robert Darwin, honouring his deceased brother.

Erasmus was a freethinker who hypothesised that all warm-blooded animals sprang from a single living "filament" long, long ago. He further proposed evolution by acquired characteristics, anticipating the theory later developed by Jean-Baptiste Lamarck. Although Charles was born after his grandfather Erasmus died, his father Robert found the texts an invaluable medical guide and Charles read them as a student. Doctor Robert also followed Erasmus in being a freethinker, but as a wealthy society physician was more discreet and attended the Church of England patronised by his clients.

== Childhood ==
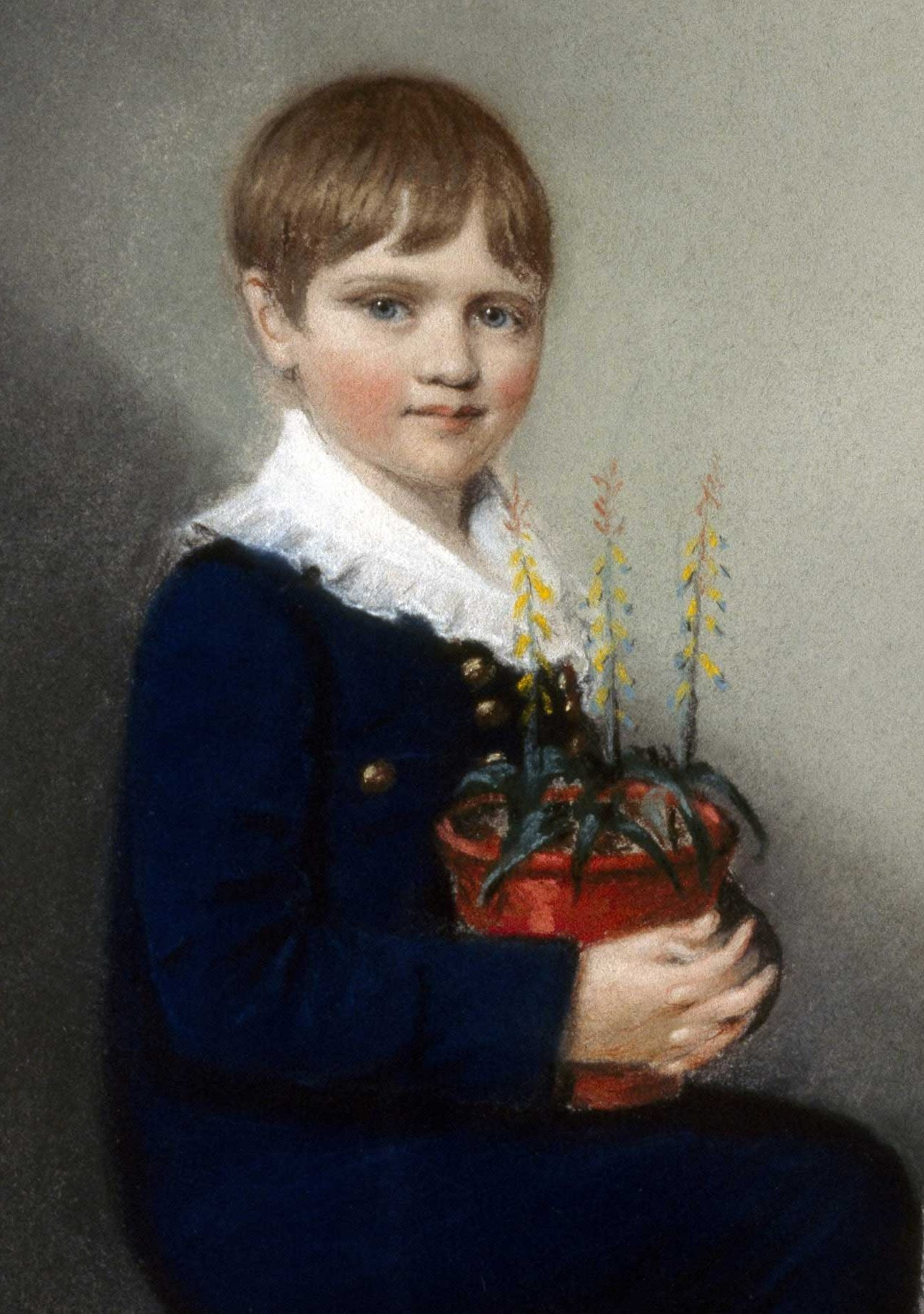
The seven-year-old Charles Darwin in 1816, a year before the sudden loss of his mother

Charles Robert Darwin was born in Shrewsbury, Shropshire, England on 12 February 1809 at his family home, the Mount, He was the fifth of six children of wealthy society doctor and financier Robert Waring Darwin, and Susannah Darwin (née Wedgwood). Both families were largely Unitarian, though the Wedgwoods were adopting Anglicanism. Robert Waring Darwin, himself quietly a freethinker, had baby Charles baptised on 15 November 1809 in the Anglican St Chad's Church, Shrewsbury, but Charles and his siblings attended the Unitarian chapel with their mother.

As a young child at The Mount, Darwin avidly collected animal shells, postal franks, bird's eggs, pebbles and minerals. He was very fond of gardening, an interest his father shared and encouraged, and would follow the family gardener around. Early in 1817, soon after becoming eight years old, he started at the small local school run by a Unitarian minister, the Reverend George Case. At home, Charles learned to ride ponies, shoot and fish. Influenced by his father's fashionable interest in natural history, he tried to make out the names of plants and was given by his father two elementary natural history books. Childhood games included inventing and writing out complex secret codes. Charles would tell elaborate stories to his family and friends "for the pure pleasure of attracting attention & surprise", including hoaxes such as pretending to find apples he'd hidden earlier, and what he later called the "monstrous fable" which persuaded his schoolfriend that the colour of primula flowers could be changed by dosing them with special water. However, his father benignly ignored these passing games, and Charles later recounted that he stopped them because no one paid any attention.

In July 1817 his mother died after the sudden onset of violent stomach pains and amidst the grief, his older sisters had to take charge, with their father continuing to dominate the household whenever he returned from his doctor's rounds. To the 8 1/2-year-old Charles this situation was not a great change, as his mother had frequently been ill and her available time taken up by social duties, so his upbringing had largely been in the hands of his three older sisters who were nearly adults by then. In later years he had difficulty in remembering his mother, and his only memory of her death and funeral was of the children being sent for and going into her room, and his "Father meeting us crying afterwards".

As had been planned previously, in September 1818 Charles joined his older brother Erasmus Alvey Darwin (nicknamed "Eras") in staying as a boarder at the Shrewsbury School, where he loathed the required rote learning, and would try to visit home when he could, but also made many friends and developed interests. Years later, he recalled being "very fond of playing at Hocky on the ice in skates" in the wintertime. He continued collecting minerals and insects, and family holidays in Wales brought Charles new opportunities, but an older sister ruled that "it was not right to kill insects" for his collections, and he had to find dead ones. He read Gilbert White's The Natural History and Antiquities of Selborne and took up birdwatching. Eras took an interest in chemistry and Charles became his assistant, with the two using a garden shed at their home fitted out as a laboratory and extending their interests to crystallography. When Eras went on to a medical course at the University of Cambridge, Charles continued to rush home to the shed on weekends, and for this received the nickname "Gas". The headmaster was not amused at this diversion from studying the classics, calling him a poco curante (trifler) in front of the boys. At fifteen, his interest shifted to hunting and bird-shooting at local estates, particularly at Maer in Staffordshire, the home of his relatives, the Wedgwoods. His exasperated father once told him off, saying "You care for nothing but shooting, dogs, and rat-catching, and you will be a disgrace to yourself and all your family."

His father decided that he should leave school earlier than usual, and in 1825 at the age of sixteen Charles was to go along with his brother who was to attend the University of Edinburgh for a year to obtain medical qualifications. Charles spent the summer as an apprentice doctor, helping his father with treating the poor of Shropshire. He had half a dozen patients of his own, and would note their symptoms for his father to make up the prescriptions.

== University of Edinburgh ==
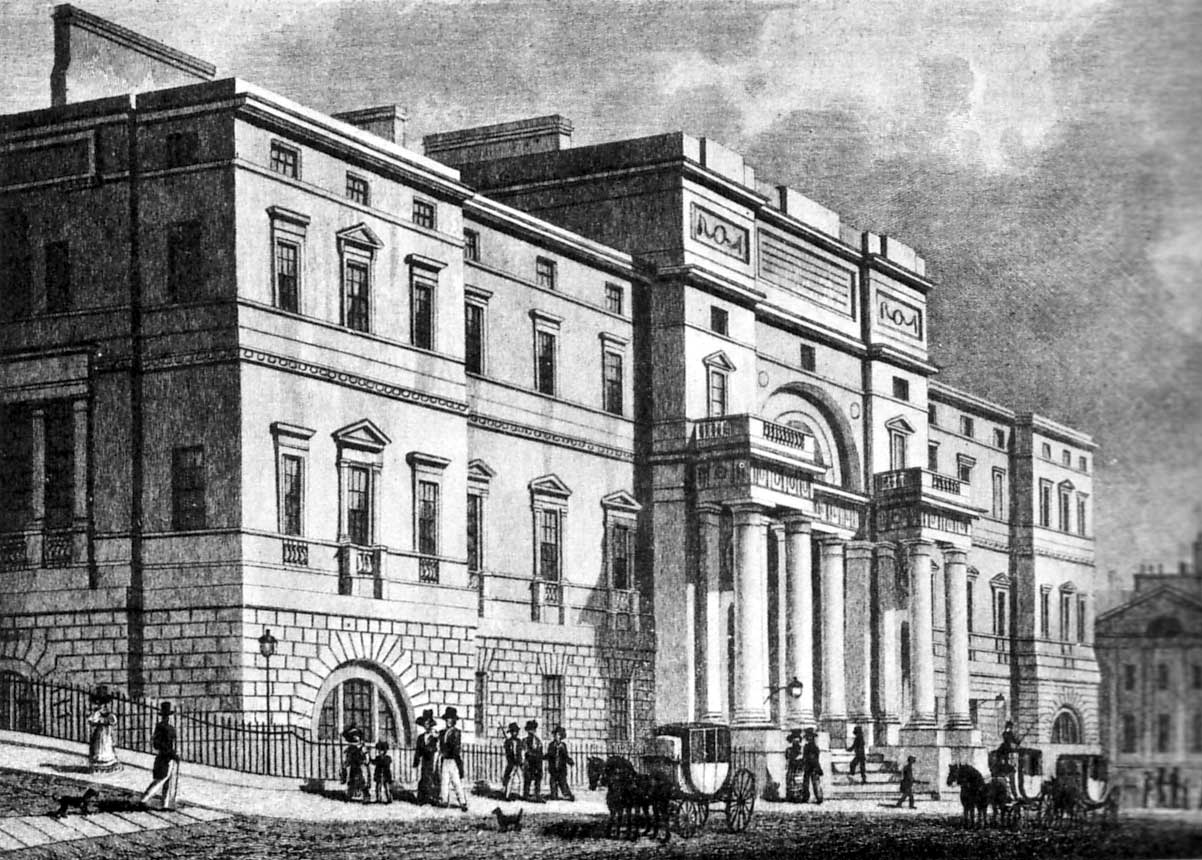
Darwin attended the University of Edinburgh to study medicine, at a time when its new buildings (shown here) were still under construction. View along South Bridge Street, towards the bridge crossing high above the Cowgate. On the left, South College Street leads up to Lothian Street.

In October 1825, Darwin went to Edinburgh University to study medicine, accompanied by Eras doing his external hospital study. For a few days, while looking for rooms to rent, the brothers stayed at the Star Hotel in Princes Street. They took up an introduction to a friend of their father, Dr. Hawley, who led them on a walk around the town. They admired it immensely; Darwin thought Bridge Street "most extraordinary" as, on looking over the sides, "instead of a fine river we saw a stream of people".

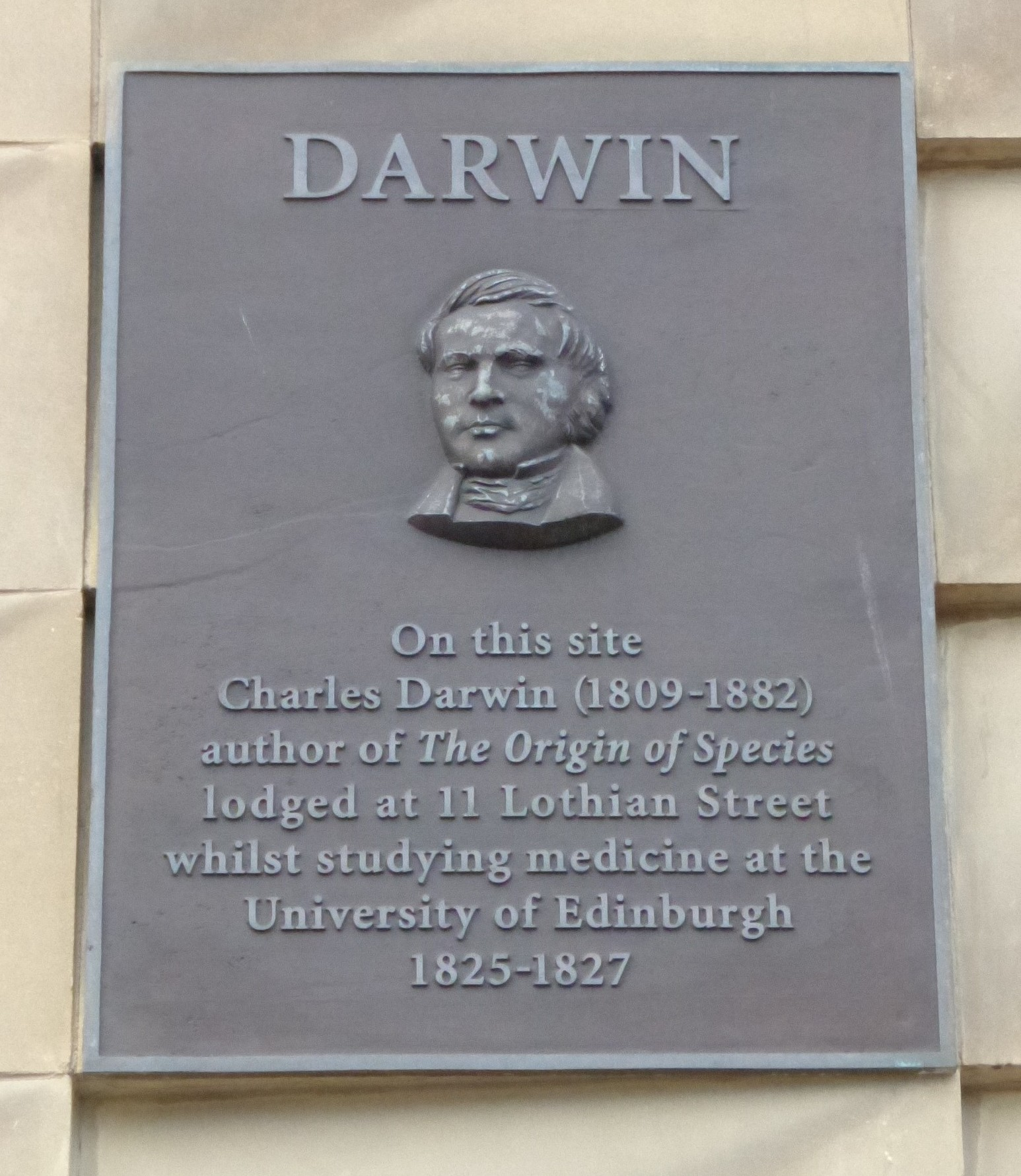
Plaque in Lothian Street, indicating where Darwin lived while studying at Edinburgh

The brothers found comfortable lodgings near the University at 11 Lothian Street, on 22 October Charles signed the matriculation book, and enrolled in courses. That evening, they moved in.

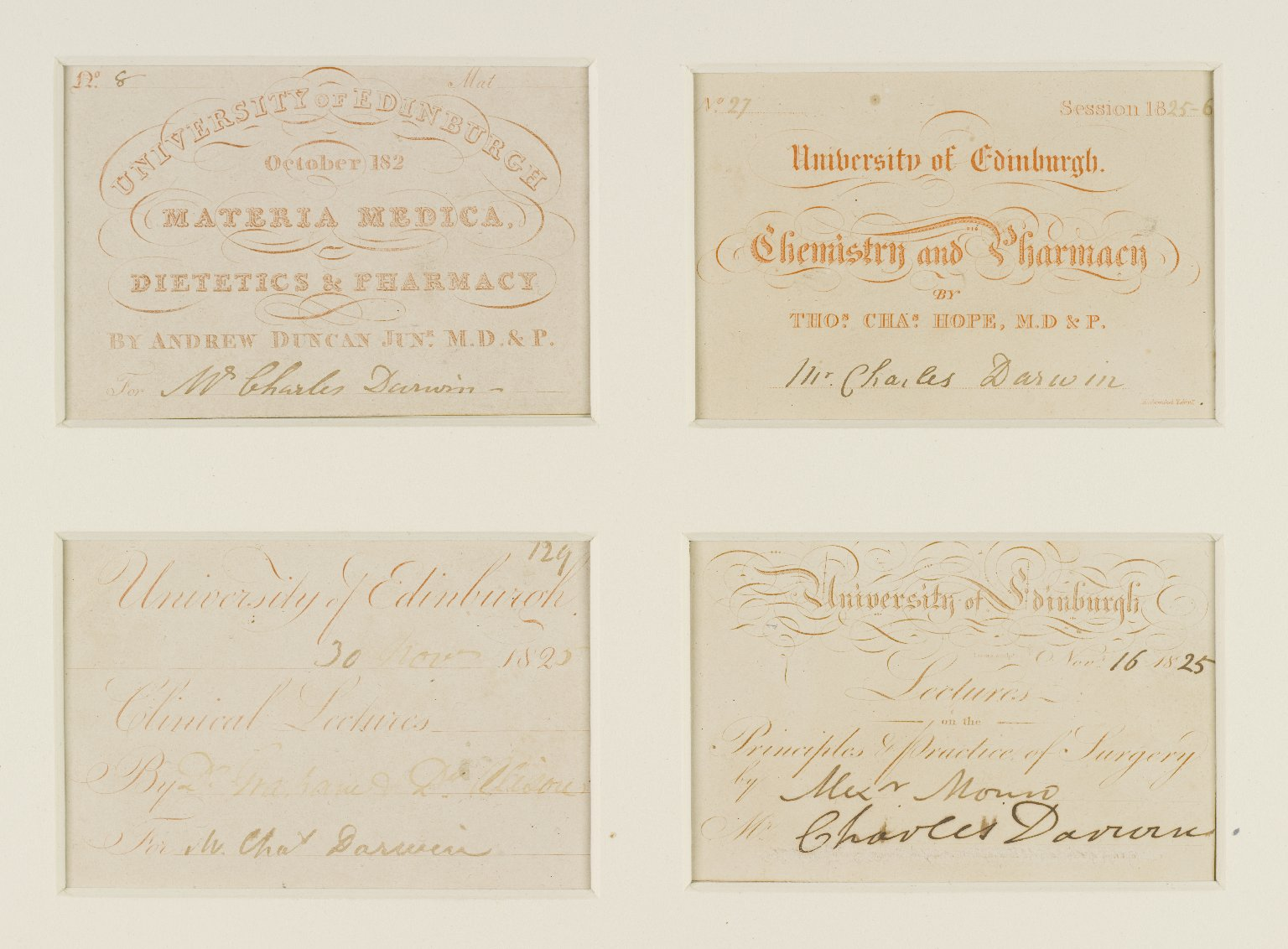
Class cards for Darwin to attend lectures

Darwin attended classes from their start on 26 October. By early January he had formed opinions on the lecturers, and complained that most were boring. Andrew Duncan, the younger, taught dietetics, pharmacy, and materia medica. Darwin thought the latter stupid, and said Duncan was "so very learned that his wisdom has left no room for his sense". His lectures began at 8 a.m. – years later Darwin recalled "a whole, cold, breakfastless hour on the properties of rhubarb!", but they usefully introduced him to the natural system of classification of Augustin de Candolle, who emphasised the "war" between competing species.

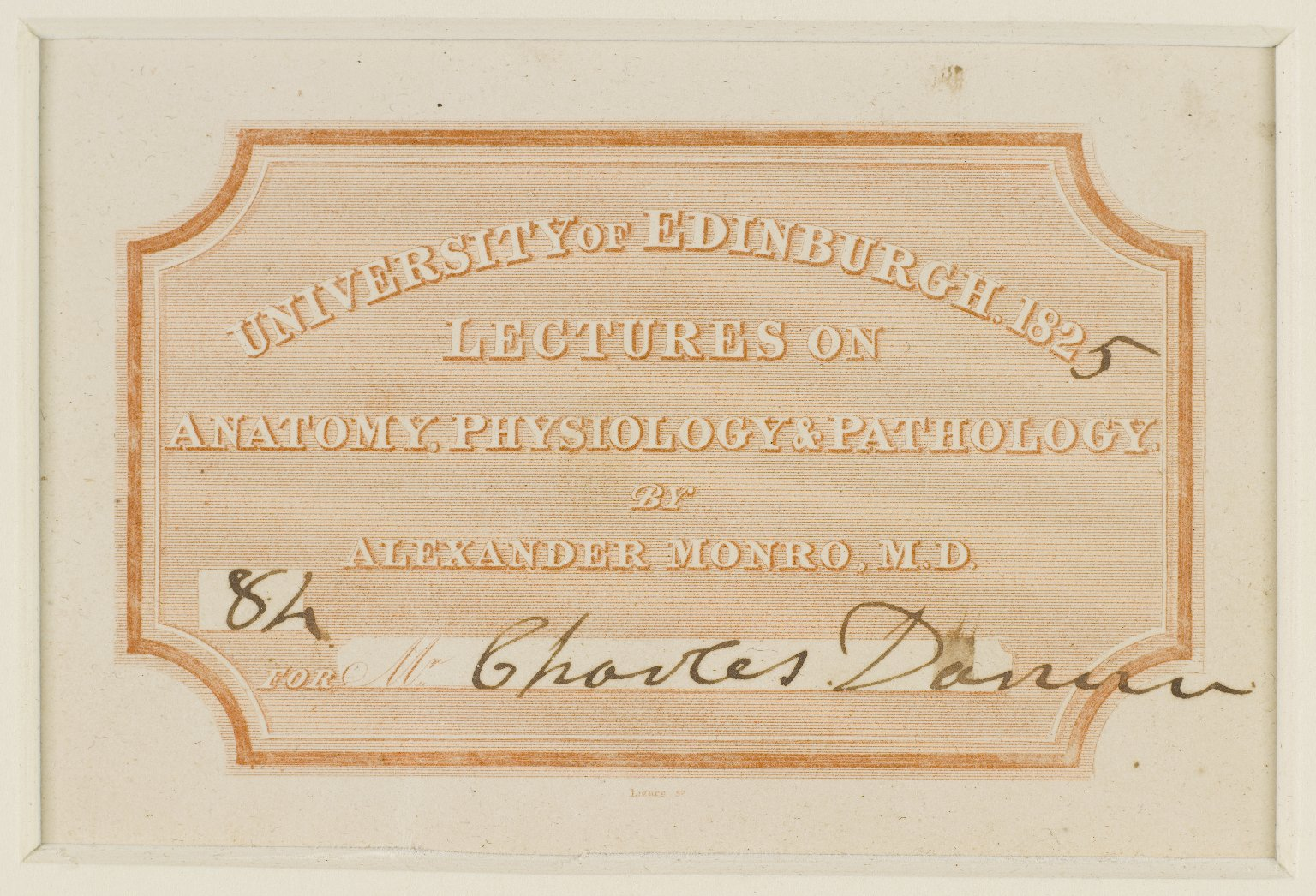
Class card Darwin bought for the anatomy lectures of Alexander Monro

From 10 a.m., the brothers greatly enjoyed the spectacular chemistry lectures of Thomas Charles Hope, but they did not join a student society giving hands-on experience. Anatomy and surgery classes began at noon, Darwin was disgusted by the dull and outdated anatomy lectures of professor Alexander Monro tertius, many students went instead to private independent schools, with new ideas of teaching by dissecting corpses (giving clandestine trade to bodysnatchers) – his brother went to a "charming Lecturer", the surgeon John Lizars. Darwin later regretted his own failure to persevere and learn dissection. The city was in an uproar over political and religious controversies, and the competitive system where professors were dependent on attracting student fees for income meant that the university was riven with argumentative feuds and conflicts. Monro's lectures included vehement opposition to George Combe's daringly materialist ideas of phrenology, but Darwin found "his lectures on human anatomy as dull, as he was himself, and the subject disgusted me." Eventually, to Darwin's mind there were "no advantages and many disadvantages in lectures compared with reading."

Darwin regularly attended clinical wards in the hospital despite his great distress about some of the cases, but could only bear to attend surgical operations twice, rushing away before they were completed due to his distress at the brutality of surgery before anaesthetics. He was long haunted by the memory, particularly of an operation on a child.

At the end of January, Darwin wrote home that they had "been very dissipated", having dined with Dr. Hawley then gone to the theatre with a relative of the botanist Robert Kaye Greville. They also visited "the old Dr. Duncan", who spoke with the warmest affection about his student and friend Charles Darwin (Darwin's uncle) who had died in 1778. Darwin wrote "What an extraordinary old man he is, now being past 80, & continuing to lecture", though Dr. Hawley thought Duncan was now failing. Darwin added that "I am going to learn to stuff birds, from a blackamoor... he only charges one guinea, for an hour every day for two months". These lessons in taxidermy were with the freed black slave John Edmonstone, who also lived in Lothian Street. Darwin often sat with him to hear tales of the South American rain-forest of Guyana, and later remembered him as "a very pleasant and intelligent man."

The brothers kept each other company, and made extensive use of the library. Darwin's reading included novels and Boswell's Life of Johnson. He had brought natural history books with him, including a copy of A Naturalist's Companion by George Graves, bought in August in anticipation of seeing the seaside. He borrowed similar books from the library, and also read Fleming's Philosophy of Zoology.

The brothers went for regular Sunday walks to the seaport of Leith and the shores of the Firth of Forth. Darwin kept a diary recording bird observations, and their seashore finds which began with a sea mouse (Aphrodita aculeata) he caught on 2 February and identified from his copy of William Turton's British fauna. A few days later Darwin noted "Erasmus caught a Cuttle fish", wondering if it was "Sepia Loligo", then from his textbooks identified it as Loligo sagittata (a squid). A few days later, Darwin returned with a basin and caught a globular orange zoophyte, then after storms at the start of March saw the shore "literally covered with Cuttle fish". He touched them so they emitted ink and swam away, and also found a damaged starfish beginning to regrow its arms. Eras completed his external hospital study, and returned to Shrewsbury, Darwin found other zoophytes and, on the shore "between Leith & Portobello", caught more sea mice which "when thrown into the sea rolled themselves up like hedgehogs."

On 27 March, Susan Darwin wrote to pass on their father's disapproval of Darwin's "plan of picking & chusing what lectures you like to attend", as "you cannot have enough information to know what may be of use to you". His son's "present indulgent way" would make studies "utterly useless", and he wanted Darwin to complete the course. Darwin wrote home apologetically on 8 April with the news that "Dr. Hope has been giving some very good Lectures on Electricity &c. and I am very glad I stayed for them", requesting money to fund staying on another 9 to 14 days.

During his summer holiday Charles read Zoönomia by his grandfather Erasmus Darwin, which his father valued for medical guidance but which also proposed evolution by acquired characteristics. In June he went on a walking tour in North Wales.

=== Natural history in second year ===
In October Charles returned on his own for his second year, and took smaller lodgings in a top flat at 21 Lothian Street. He joined the required classes of Practice of Physic and Midwifery, but by then realised he would inherit property and need not make "any strenuous effort to learn medicine". For his own interests, and to meet other students, he joined Robert Jameson's natural history course which started on 8 November. It was unique in Britain, covering a wide range of topics including geology, zoology, mineralogy, meteorology and botany.

Jameson was a Neptunian geologist who taught Werner's view that all rock strata had precipitated from a universal ocean, and founded the Wernerian Natural History Society to discuss and publish science. He encouraged debate, and in lectures pointedly disagreed with chemistry professor Hope who held that granites had crystallised from molten crust, influenced by the Plutonism of James Hutton who had been Hope's friend. In 1827, Jameson told a commission of inquiry into the curriculum that "It would be a misfortune if we all had the same way of thinking... Dr Hope is decidedly opposed to me, and I am opposed to Dr Hope, and between us we make the subject interesting."

Jameson edited the quarterly Edinburgh New Philosophical Journal, with an international reputation for publishing science. It could touch on controversial subjects; in the April–October 1826 edition an anonymous paper proposed that geological study of fossils could "lift the veil that hangs over the origin and progress of the organic world". It praised Lamarck's transmutation of species concept that from "the simplest worms" arising by spontaneous generation and affected by external circumstances, all other animals "are evolved from these in a double series, and in a gradual manner." This was the first use of the word "evolved" in a modern sense, and the first significant statement to relate Lamarck's concepts to the geological fossil record. It seems likely that Jameson wrote it, but it could have been a former student of his, possibly Ami Boué.

Through family connections, Darwin was introduced to the reforming educationalist Leonard Horner who took him to the opening of the 1826–1827 session of the Royal Society of Edinburgh, presided over by Sir Walter Scott. Darwin "looked at him and at the whole scene with some awe and reverence".

=== Student societies ===
To make friends, Darwin had visiting cards printed, and joined student societies. He attended the Royal Medical Society regularly though uninterested in its medical topics, and remembered James Kay-Shuttleworth as a good speaker.

On 21 November 1826 Darwin (17 years old) petitioned to join the Plinian Society, student-run, with professors excluded. At its Tuesday evening meetings, members read short papers, sometimes controversial, mostly on natural history topics or about their research excursions. The secretary minuted the titles, any publication was in other journals. Three of its five presidents proposed him for membership: William A. F. Browne (21), John Coldstream (19) and medical student George Fife (19). A week later, Darwin was elected, as was William R. Greg (17) who offered a controversial talk to prove "the lower animals possess every faculty & propensity of the human mind", in a materialist view of nature as just physical forces. Darwin was elected to its council on 5 December, at the same meeting Browne, a radical demagogue opposed to church doctrines, attacked Charles Bell's Anatomy and Physiology of Expression (which in 1872 Darwin addressed in The Expression of the Emotions in Man and Animals), flatly rejecting Bell's belief that the Creator had endowed humans with unique anatomical features. Greg and Browne were both avid proponents of phrenology to undermine aristocratic rule. Darwin found the meetings stimulating and attended 17, missing only one.

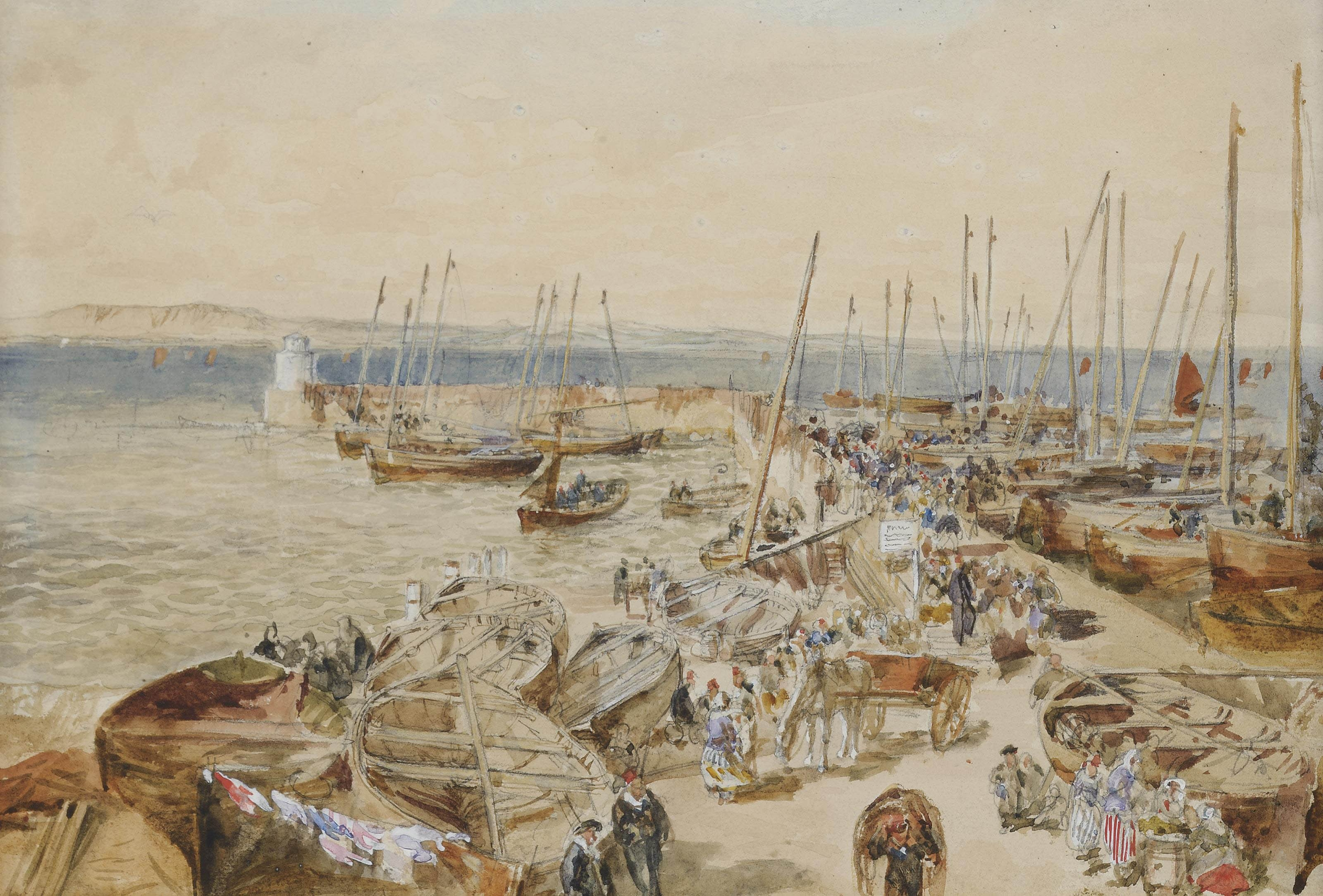
19th century; fishing boats at Newhaven, view over Firth of Forth to Fife.

Darwin became friends with Coldstream who was "prim, formal, highly religious and most kind-hearted". Coldstream's interest in the skies and identifying sea creatures on the Firth of Forth shore went back to his childhood in Leith. He had joined the Plinian in 1823, his diary around then noted self-blame and torment, but he persisted and in 1824 became one of its presidents. He regularly published in the Edinburgh Philosophical Journal, and also assisted the research of Robert Edmond Grant, who had studied under Jameson before graduating in 1814, and was researching simple marine lifeforms for evidence of the transmutation conjectured in Erasmus Darwin's Zoonomia and Lamarck's writings. Grant was active in the Plinian and on the council of the Wernerian Society, where he took Darwin as a guest to meetings. The Wernerian was visited by John James Audubon three times that winter, and Darwin saw his lectures on the habits of North American birds.

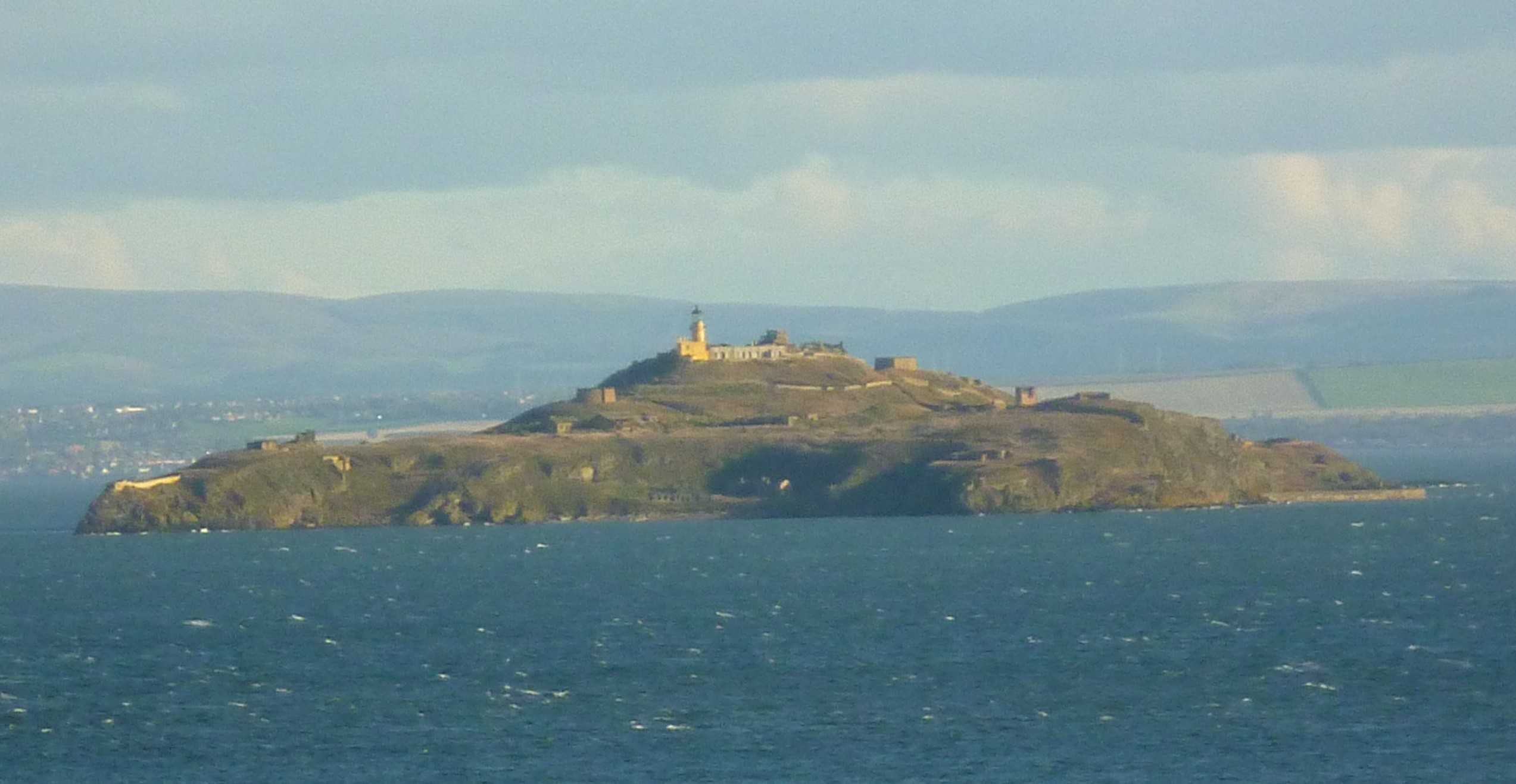
Inchkeith, seen from Fife. The old lighthouse on the skyline, and modern fortifications.

With Coldstream, Darwin walked along the shore looking for animals in tidal pools, and became friends with oyster fishermen from nearby Newhaven who took them along to pick specimens from the catches. He went long walks with Grant and others, frequently with William Ainsworth, one of the Presidents who became a Wernerian geologist. As well as the shores of the Forth, he and Ainsworth took boat trips to Fife and the islands. On the Isle of May with the botanist Robert Kaye Greville, this "eminent cryptogamist" laughed so much at screeching seabirds that he had to "lie down on the greensward to enjoy his prolonged cachinnation." On another trip, Darwin and Ainsworth got stuck overnight on Inchkeith and had to stay in the lighthouse. Routes to the Firth soon became familiar, and after another student presented a paper to the Plinian in the common literary form of describing the sights from a journey, Darwin and William Kay (another president) drafted a parody, to be read taking turns, describing "a complete failure" of an excursion from the university via Holyrood House, where Salisbury Craigs, ruined by quarrying, were completely hidden by "dense & impenetrable mist", along a dirty track to Portobello shore, where "Inch Keith, the Bas-rock, the distant hills in Fifeshire" were similarly hidden – the sole sight of interest, as Dr Johnson had said, was the "high-road to England". High tide prevented any seashore finds so, rejecting "Haggis or Scotch Collops", they dined on (English) "Beef-steak".

=== Geology and Origin of the Species ===
Jameson's own main topic was mineralogy, his natural history course covered zoology and geology, with instruction on meteorology and hydrography, and some discussion on botany as it related to "the animal and mineral kingdoms." Lectures began on 9 November and were on five days a week for five months (ending a week into April). Zoology began with the natural history of man, followed by chief classes of vertebrates and invertebrates, then concluded with philosophy of zoology starting with "Origin of the Species of Animals". As well as field lectures, the course made full use of the Royal Museum of the university which Jameson had developed into one of the largest in Europe. Darwin's flat was near the entrance to the museum in the western part of the university, he assisted and made full use of the collections, spending hours studying, taking notes and stuffing specimens. He "had much interesting natural-history talk" with the curator, William MacGillivray, who later published a book on the birds of Scotland.

The geology course gave Darwin a grounding in mineralogy and stratigraphy geology. He bought Jameson's 1821 Manual of Mineralogy, its first part classifies minerals comprehensively on the system of Friedrich Mohs, the second part includes concepts of field geology such as defining strike and dip of strata. Darwin heavily annotated his copy of the book, sometimes when in lectures (though not always paying attention), and noted where it related to museum exhibits. He also read Jameson's translation of Cuvier's Essay on the Theory of the Earth , covering fossils and extinctions in revolutions such as the Flood. In the preface, Jameson said geology discloses "the history of the first origin of organic beings, and traces their gradual developement [sic] from the monade to man himself".

The lectures were heavy going for a young student, and Darwin remembered Jameson as an "old brown, dry stick", He recalled Jameson's lectures as "incredibly dull. The sole effect they produced on me was the determination never as long as I lived to read a book on Geology or in any way to study the science. Yet I feel sure that I was prepared for a philosophical treatment of the subject", and he had been delighted when he read an explanation for erratic boulders.

Jameson still held to Werner's Neptunist concept that phenomena such as trap dykes had precipitated from a universal ocean. By then, geologists increasingly accepted that trap rock had igneous origins, a Plutonist view promoted by Hope, who had been James Hutton's friend. From hearing exponents of both sides, Darwin learned the range of current opinion. His grandfather Erasmus had favoured Plutonism, and Darwin later supported Huttonian ideas. Almost fifty years after the course, Darwin recalled Jameson giving a field lecture at Salisbury Crags, "discoursing on a trap-dyke" with "volcanic rocks all around us", saying it was "a fissure filled with sediment from above, adding with a sneer that there were men who maintained that it had been injected from beneath in a molten condition. When I think of this lecture, I do not wonder that I determined never to attend to Geology."

=== Sealife homologies and monads ===
In his autobiography, begun in 1876, Darwin remembered Robert Edmond Grant as "dry and formal in manner, but with much enthusiasm beneath this outer crust. He one day, when we were walking together burst forth in high admiration of Lamarck and his views on evolution. I listened in silent astonishment, and as far as I can judge, without any effect on my mind. I had previously read the Zoönomia of my grandfather, in which similar views are maintained, but without producing any effect on me."

Grant's doctoral dissertation, prepared in 1813, cited Erasmus Darwin's Zoönomia which suggested that over geological time all organic life could have gradually arisen from a kind of "living filament" capable of heritable self-improvement. He found in Lamarck's similar uniformitarian theoretical framework a similar idea that spontaneously generated simple animal monads continually improved in complexity and perfection, while use or disuse of features to adapt to environmental changes diversified species and genera.

Funded by a small inheritance, Grant went to Paris University in 1815, to study with Cuvier, the leading comparative anatomist, and his rival Geoffroy. Cuvier held that species were fixed, grouped into four entirely separate embranchements, and any similarity of structures between species was merely due to functional needs. Grant favoured Geoffroy's view that similarities showed "unity of form", similar to Lamarck's ideas.

Like Lamarck, Grant investigated marine invertebrates, particularly sponges as naturalists disputed whether they were plants or animals. After specimen collecting and research in European universities, he returned to Edinburgh in 1820. Many species lived in the Firth of Forth, and Grant got winter use of Walford House, Prestonpans, with a garden gate in its high seawall leading to rock pools. He kept sponges alive in glass jars for long term observation, and at night used his microscope by candle light to dissect specimens in a watch glass.

In spring 1825 at the Wernerian, Grant dramatically dissected molluscs (squid and sea-slugs) showing they had a simple pancreas analogous to the complex pancreas in fish, controversially suggesting shared ancestry between molluscs and Cuvier's "higher" embranchement of vertebrates. In the Edinburgh Philosophical Journal Grant revealed that sponges had cilia to draw in water and expel waste, and their "ova" (larvae) were self-propelled by cilia in "spontaneous motion" like that seen by Cavolini in "ova" of the soft coral Gorgonia. In October he said simple freshwater Spongilla were ancient, ancestral to complex sponges that had adapted to sea changes, as the earth cooled and changing conditions drove life towards higher, hotter blooded forms. In May 1826 he said that "future observations" would determine if self-propelling "ova" were "general with zoophytes", his conclusions published in December included a detailed description of how sponge ova contain "monads-like bodies", and "swim about" by "the rapid vibration of ciliæ".

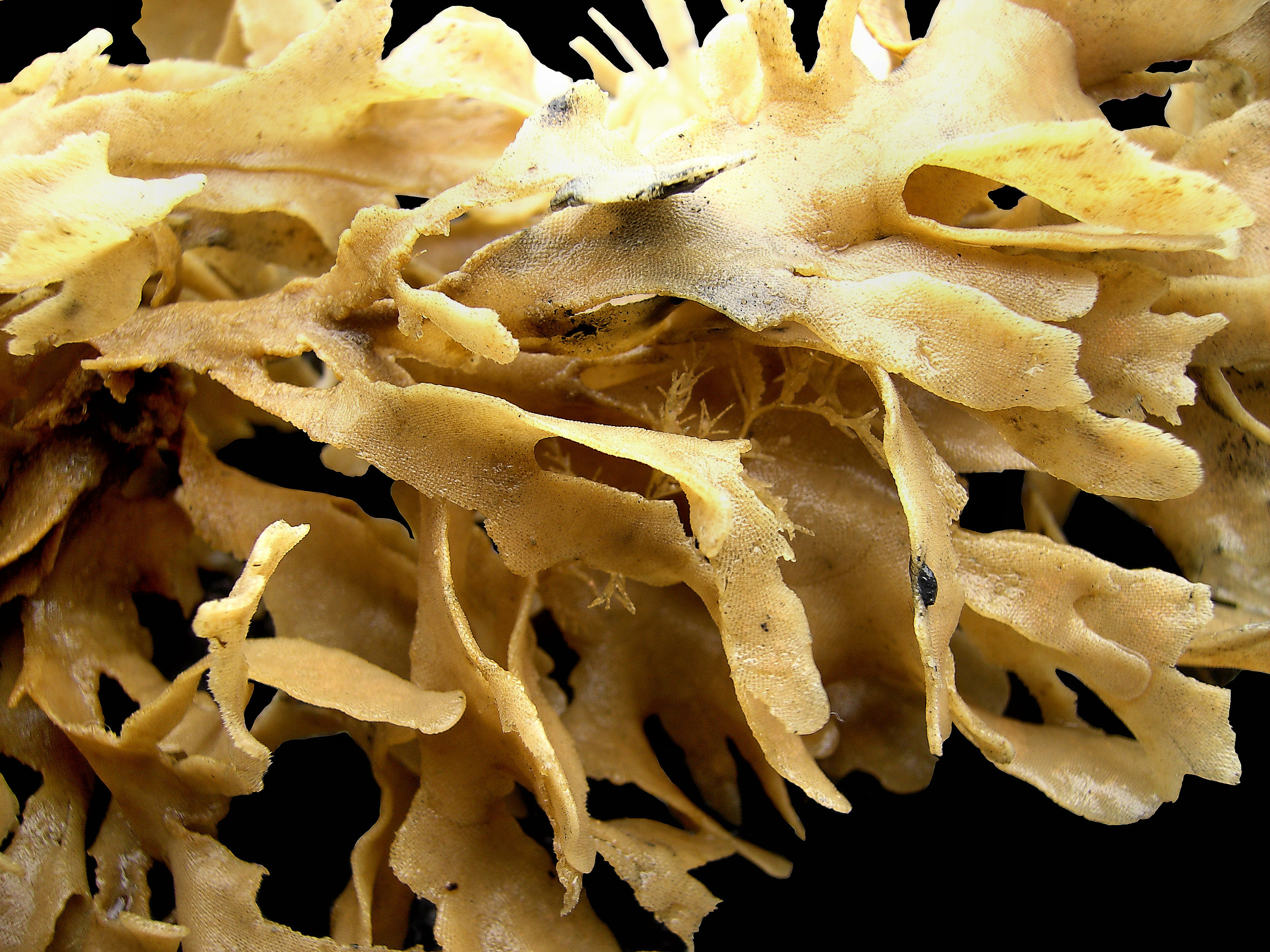
Seaweed-like Flustra foliacea – Carbasea is similar.

Coldstream assisted Grant, and that winter Darwin joined the search, learning what to look for, and dissection techniques using a portable microscope. On 16 March 1827 he noted in a new notebook that he had "Procured from the black rocks at Leith" a lumpfish, "Dissected it with Dr Grant". Two days later he recorded "ova from the Newhaven rocks" said to be of the Doris [sea slug] "in rapid motion, & continued so for 7 days", then on 19 March saw ova of the Flustra foliacea in motion. As recalled in his autobiography, he made "one interesting little discovery" that "the so-called ova of Flustra had the power of independent movement by means of cilia, and were in fact larvæ", and also that little black globular bodies found sticking to empty oyster shells, once thought to be the young of Fucus loreus, were egg-cases (cocoons) of the Pontobdella muricata (skate leech). He believed "Dr. Grant noticed my small discovery in his excellent memoir on Flustra."

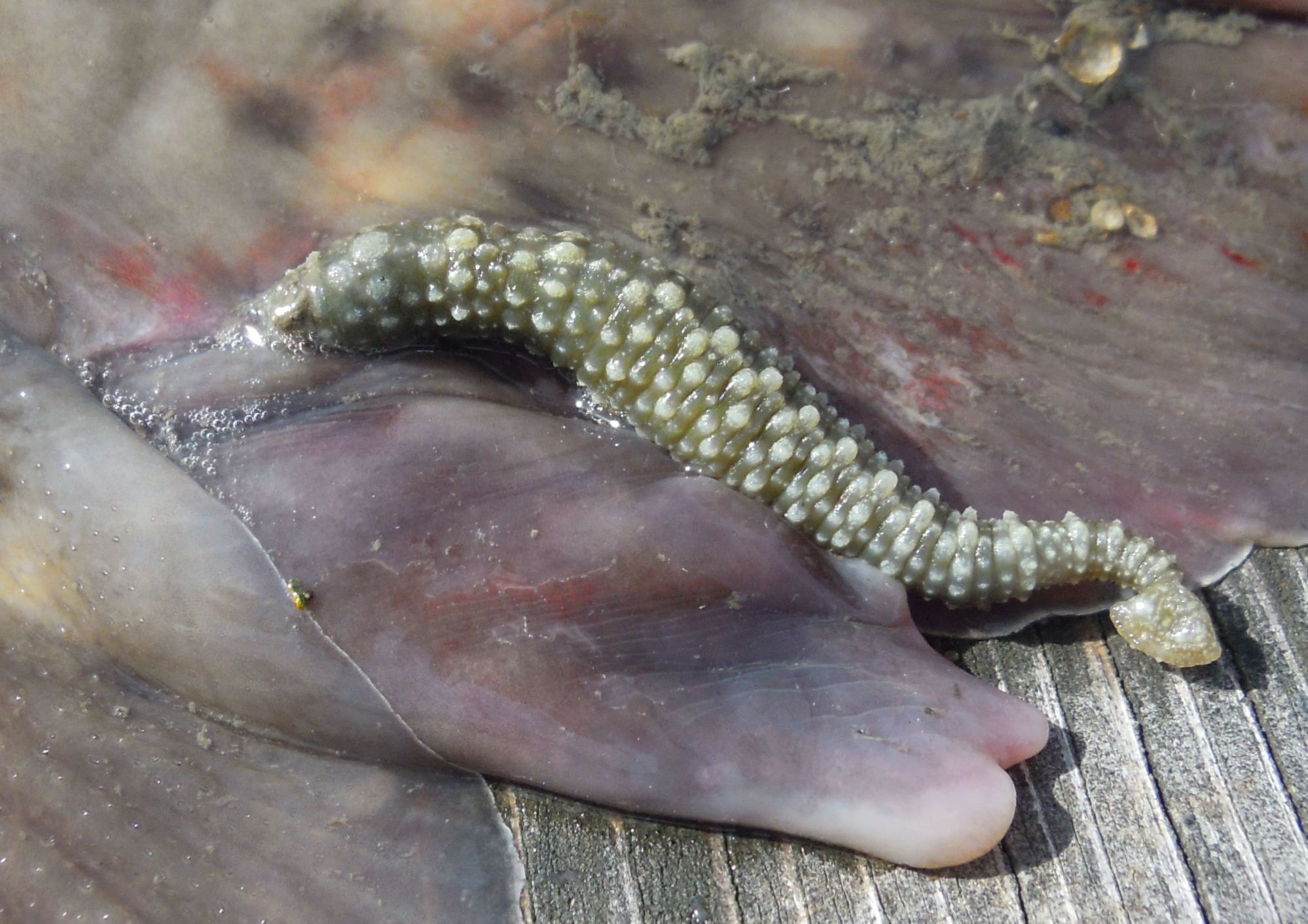
Pontobdella muricata (Skate leech)

The Wernerian society minutes for 24 March record that Grant read "a Memoir regarding the Anatomy and Mode of Generation of Flustræ, illustrated by preparations and drawings", also a notice on "the Mode of Generation" of the skate leech. Three days later, on 27 March, the Plinian Society minutes record that Darwin "communicated to the Society" two discoveries, that "the ova of the flustra possess organs of motion", and the small black "ovum" of the Pontobdella muricata. "At the request of the Society he promised to draw up an account of the facts and to lay them it, together with specimens, before the Society next evening." This was Darwin's first public presentation. In the next item, Browne argued that mind and consciousness were simply aspects of brain activity, not "souls" or spiritual entities separate from the body. Following a furious debate, the minute of this item was crossed out.

After recording more finds in April, Darwin copied into his notebook under the heading "20th" his first scientific papers. Newhaven dredge boats had provided the Flustra carbasea specimens, when "highly magnified" the "ciliae of the ova" were "seen in rapid motion", and "That such ova had organs of motion does not appear to have been hitherto observed either by Lamarck Cuvier Lamouroux or any other author." He wrote "This & the following communication was read both before the Wernerian & Plinian Societies", and wrote up a detailed account of his Pontobdella findings. At the Plinian meeting, on 3 April, Darwin presented the Society with "A specimen of the Pontobdella muricata, with its ova & young ones", but there is no record of the papers being presented or kept.

Grant in his publication about the leech eggs in the Edinburgh Journal of Science for July 1827 acknowledged "The merit of having first ascertained them to belong to that animal is due to my zealous young friend Mr Charles Darwin of Shrewsbury", the first time Darwin's name appeared in print. Grant's lengthy memoir read before the Wernerian on 24 March was split between the April and October issues of the Edinburgh New Philosophical Journal, with more detail than Darwin had given: he had seen ova (larvae) of Flustra carbasea in February, after they swam about they stuck to the glass and began to form a new colony. He noted the similarity of the cilia in "other ova", with reference to his 1826 publication describing sponge ova. Darwin was not given credit for what he felt was his discovery, and in 1871, when he discussed "the paltry feeling" of scientific priority with his daughter Henrietta, she got him to repeat the story of "his first introduction to the jealousy of scientific men"; when he had seen the ova of Flustra move he "rushed instantly to Grant" who, rather than being "delighted with so curious a fact", told Darwin "it was very unfair of him to work at Prof G's subject & in fact that he shd take it ill if my Father published it." In European university practice, team leaders reported research without naming assistants, and clearly the find was derivative from Grant's research programme: it seems likely he had already seen the ova, like the sponge ova, moving by cilia. Grant phased announcement of discoveries rather than publishing quickly, and was now looking for a professorship before he ran out of funds, but young Darwin was disappointed. As Jameson noted in October, back in 1823 Dalyell had observed the Pontobdella young leaving their cocoons.

In notes dated 15 and 23 April, Darwin described specimens of the deep-water sea pens (from fishing boats), and on 23 April, "with Mr Coldstream at the black rocks at Leith", he saw a starfish doubled up, releasing its ova.

=== Summer 1827 ===
Darwin left Edinburgh in late April, just 18 years old. In 1826 he had told his sister he would be "forced to go abroad for one year" of hospital studies, as he had to be 21 before taking his degree, but he was too upset by seeing blood or suffering, and had lost any ambition to be a doctor. He went on a short tour, visiting Dundee, St Andrews, Stirling, Glasgow, Belfast and Dublin, then in May made his first trip to London to visit his sister Caroline. They joined his uncle Josiah Wedgwood II on a trip to France, and on 26 May arrived in Paris, where Charles fended for himself for a few weeks: recently graduated Plinian society members, including Browne and Coldstream, were there for hospital studies. By July, Charles had returned to his home at The Mount, Shrewsbury. While indulging his hobby of shooting with his family's friends at the nearby Woodhouse estate of William Mostyn Owen, Darwin flirted with his second daughter, Frances Mostyn Owen.

Coldstream studied in Paris for a year, and visited places of interest. His diary notes religious thoughts, and occasional anguished comments such as "the foul mass of corruption within my own bosom", "corroding desires" and "lustful imaginations". A doctor who befriended him later said that though Coldstream had led "a blameless life", he was "more or less in the dark on the vital question of religion, and was troubled with doubts arising from certain Materialist views, which are, alas! too common among medical students." He left in June 1828 for a short tour on his way home, but fell ill in Westphalia, suffered a mental breakdown, and got back to Leith late in July. In early December Coldstream began medical practice and gave it priority over natural history.

== University of Cambridge ==
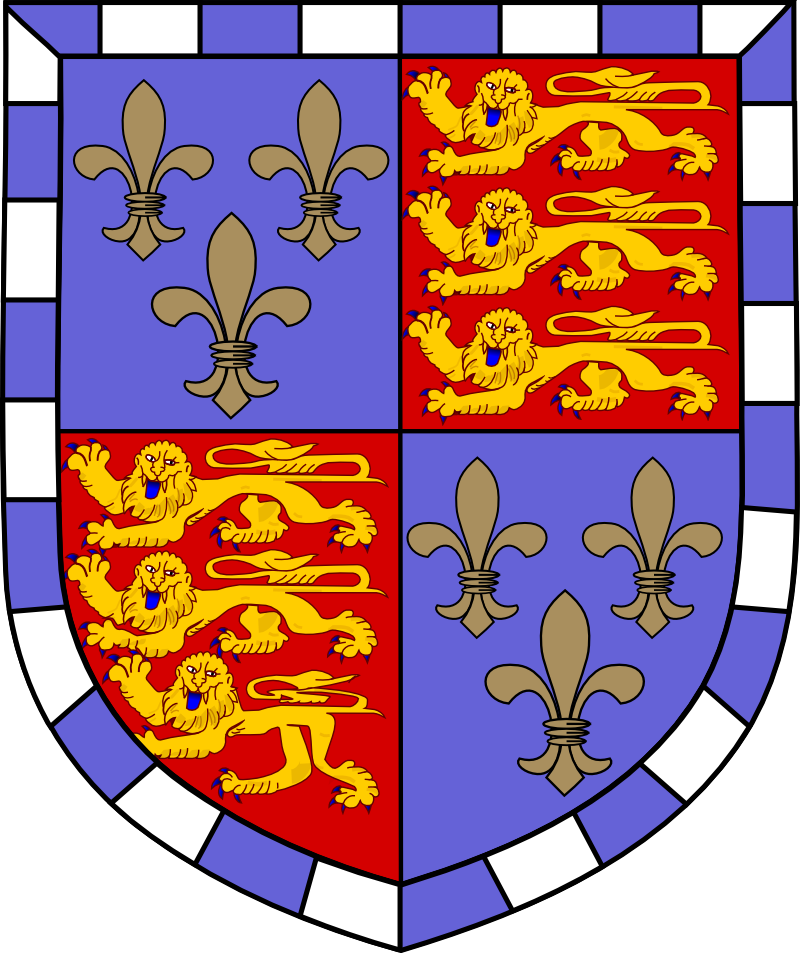
The coat of arms of Christ's College, Cambridge, a college of the University of Cambridge where Darwin was enrolled to become a clergyman.

His father was unhappy that his younger son would not become a physician and "was very properly vehement against my turning into an idle sporting man, which then seemed my probable destination." He therefore enrolled Charles at Christ's College, Cambridge in 1827 for a Bachelor of Arts degree as the qualification required before taking a specialised divinity course and becoming an Anglican parson. He enrolled for an ordinary degree, as at that time only capable mathematicians would take the Tripos. At that time the only way to get an honours degree was the mathematical Tripos examination, or the classical Tripos created in 1822, which was only open to those who already had high honours in mathematics, or those who were the sons of peers.

This was a respectable career for a gentleman at a time when most naturalists in England were clergymen in the tradition of Gilbert White, who saw it as part of their duties to "explore the wonders of God's creation". Charles had concerns about being able to declare his belief in all the dogmas of the Church of England, so as well as hunting and fishing, he studied divinity books. He was particularly convinced by the reasoning of the Revd. John Bird Sumner's Evidences of Christianity. John Bird Summer wrote that Jesus's religion was "wonderfully suitable... to our ideas of happiness in this & the next world" and there was "no other way... of explaining the series of evidence & probability." His Classics had lapsed since school, and he spent the autumn term at home studying Greek with a tutor. Darwin was accepted as a "pensioner", having paid his fees, on 15 October 1827, but did not attend Cambridge until the Lent Term which began on 13 January 1828. Eras returned from Edinburgh ready to sit his Bachelor of Medicine exam, and in the new year he and Charles set out together for Cambridge. Darwin came into residence in Cambridge on 26 January 1828, and matriculated at the university's Senate House on 26 February.

Around this time he wrote to John Coldstream, asking after him, expressing "greif" about hearing that Coldstream had "entirely forsworn Natural History", and assuring him "that no pursuit is more becoming for a physician than Nat: Hist". Coldstream replied on 28 February that he was as much "inclined than ever, to look into the World of Nature", but had to focus first on medicine.

His tutors at Christ's College, Cambridge were to include Joseph Shaw in 1828, John Graham (in 1829 – 1830) and Edward John Ash in 1830 – 1831. One of his university friends was Frederick Watkins, (1808–1888).

=== Beetle collecting ===
Arriving at the University of Cambridge in January 1828, Darwin found this elite theological training institution governed by complex rules much more congenial than his experiences at Edinburgh. No rooms were available at Christ's College, so he took lodgings above a tobacconists in Sidney Street, across the road. In April the older student Albert Way drew a comic coat of arms featuring tobacco pipes, cigars, wine barrel and tankards, with a Latin statement that they were best friends; at Edinburgh, Darwin had begun a life-long habit of taking snuff. Extramural activities were important, and while Darwin did not take up sports or debating, his interests included music and his main passion was the current national craze for the (competitive) collecting of beetles. Trainee clergymen scoured Cambridgeshire for specimens, referring to An Introduction to Entomology by William Kirby and William Spence. Charles joined his older cousin William Darwin Fox who was already a skilled collector and like him got a small dog. The two and their dogs became inseparable. They explored the countryside as Darwin learnt about natural history from his cousin. Darwin became obsessed with winning the student accolade and collected avidly. Once he stripped bark from a dead tree and caught a ground beetle in each hand, then saw the rare Crucifix Ground Beetle, Panagaeus cruxmajor. With the habits of an egg-collector, he popped one ground beetle in his mouth to free his hand, but it ejected some intensely acrid fluid which burnt his tongue and Darwin was forced to spit it out. He lost all three. The specimens he did not lose had to be mounted and identified, and his knowledge from Edinburgh of Lamarck proved useful. Fox introduced him for advice on identification to the Revd. John Stevens Henslow, professor of botany, and Darwin began attending his soirées, a club for budding naturalists. Here he could meet other professors including the geologist the Revd. Adam Sedgwick and the new mineralogist the Revd. William Whewell.

In the summer Darwin paid visits to Squire Owen, and romance seemed to be blossoming with the squire's daughter Fanny. Darwin joined other Cambridge friends on a three-month "reading party" at Barmouth on the coast of Wales to revise their studies with private tutors. For Charles it was an "Entomo-Mathematical expedition". Though he badly needed to catch up with his mathematics, the insect collecting predominated along with pleasant diversions such as hillwalking, boating and fly fishing. He went on daily walks with his close friend, the older student John Maurice Herbert who he dubbed "Cherbury" after Herbert of Cherbury, the father of English Deism. Herbert assisted with the insect collecting, but the usual outcome was that Darwin would examine Herbert's collecting bottle and say "Well, old Cherbury, none of these will do." In September Darwin wrote to tell "My dear old Cherbury" that his own catches had included "some of the rarest of the British Insects, & their being found near Barmouth is quite unknown to the Entomological world: I think I shall write & inform some of the crack Entomologists." He described these "extremely rare" insects and asked Herbert to oblige him by collecting some more of them.

=== Second year doldrums ===
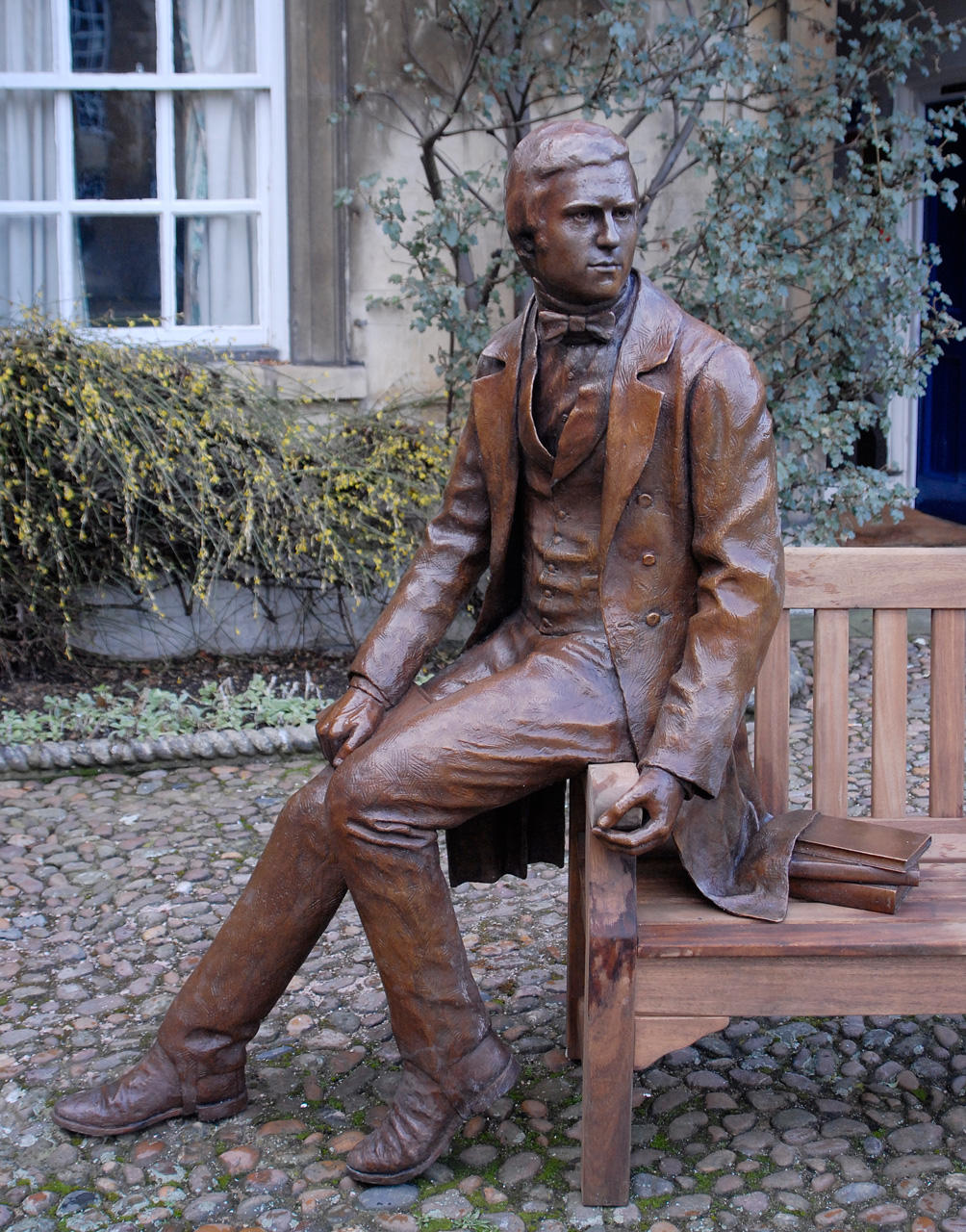
Bicentennial portrait by Anthony Smith of Darwin as a student, in the First Court at Christ's opposite Darwin's rooms.

On 31 October Charles returned to Cambridge for the Michaelmas Term, and was allocated a set of rooms on the south side of First Court in Christ's College. Although several biographers since the 1980s have referred to these rooms as traditionally having been occupied by the theologian William Paley, research by John van Wyhe found that historical documentation did not support this idea.

Darwin now had breakfast every day with his older cousin William Darwin Fox. This was Fox's last term before his BA exam, and he now had to cram desperately to make up for lost time. At the Christmas holiday Charles visited London with Eras, toured the scientific institutions "where Naturalists are gregarious" and through his friend the Revd. Frederick William Hope met other insect collectors. These included James Stephens, author of Illustrations of British Entomology.

The January term brought miserable weather and a struggle to keep up with his studies. Around this time, he had an earnest conversation with John Herbert about going into Holy Orders, and asked him whether he could answer yes to the question that the Bishop would put in the ordination service, "Do you trust that you are inwardly moved by the Holy Spirit". When Herbert said that he could not, Darwin replied "Neither can I, and therefore I cannot take orders" to become an ordained priest. Even his interest in insect collecting waned. He fell out with one of the two locals he employed to catch beetles when he found that the local was giving first choice to a rival collector. In the doldrums, he joined a crowd of drinking pals in a frequent "debauch". He put in some hard riding. On one night he and three friends saw the sky lit up and "rode like incarnate devils" eleven miles to see the blaze. They arrived back at two in the morning and violated curfew. He was risking "rustication", temporary expulsion. Such behaviour would be noticed by the Proctors, university officials appointed from the colleges who patrolled the town in plain gowns to police the students.

Student resentment against two unpopular Proctors built up, and on 9 April 1829 a tumult broke out. Charles described how the Senior Proctor was "most gloriously hissed.. & pelted with mud", being "driven so furious" that his servant "dared not go near him for an hour." The Proctors had noted some faces in the mob, and four were rusticated and one fined for being out-of-gown and shouting abuse. Outraged by this leniency, the Proctors quit en masse and printed their resignation to post up around the colleges. Though the unpopular Proctors were gone, Charles was jolted into thinking of the consequences of law-breaking.

In the Spring, Darwin enrolled for John Stevens Henslow's lectures on botany. Professor Henslow's first "public herborizing expedition" of the year took place in May, an outing on which students assisted with collection of plants. However, Darwin made no mention of Henslow in his letters to Fox. On 18 May Darwin wrote to Fox enthusing about his success with beetle collecting, "I think I beat Jenyns in Colymbetes", contrasted with his lack of application to studies: "my time is solely occupied in riding & Entomologizing".

Cambridge was briefly visited on 21 May by the Radicals Richard Carlile and the Revd. Robert Taylor, both recently jailed for blasphemy, on an "infidel home missionary tour" which caused several days of controversy. Taylor was later nicknamed "the Devil's Chaplain", a phrase remembered by Darwin.

Charles had been sending records of the insects he had caught to the entomologist James Francis Stephens, and was thrilled when Stephens published about thirty of these records in Illustrations of British entomology; or, a synopsis of indigenous insects etc. which was printed in parts, with the first description under Darwin's name appearing in an appendix dated 15 June 1829.

That summer, amongst horse riding and beetle collecting, Charles visited his cousin Fox, and this time Charles was teaching entomology to his older cousin. Home at Shrewsbury, Shropshire, he saw his brother Erasmus whose "delicate frame" led to him now giving up medicine and retiring at the age of 26. The brothers visited the Birmingham Music Festival for what Charles described as the "most glorious" experience.

=== Third year, theology and natural history ===
Back at Cambridge, Charles studied hard for his Little Go preliminary exam, as a fail would mean a re-sit the following year. He dropped his drinking companions and resumed attending Henslow's Friday evening soirées. For the exam he slogged away at Greek and Latin, and studied William Paley's Evidences of Christianity, becoming so delighted with Paley's logic that he learnt it well. This was a text he also had to study for his finals, and he was "convinced that I could have written out the whole of the Evidences with perfect correctness, but not of course in the clear language of Paley." Later, on the Beagle expedition, he saw evidence which challenged Paley's rose-tinted view, but at this time he was convinced that the Christian revelation established "a future state of reward and punishment" which "gives order for confusion: makes the moral world of a piece with the natural". As with Cambridge University, God gave authority and assigned stations in life, misconduct was penalised and excellence bountifully rewarded. Charles took the one-day verbal examination on 24 March 1830. There were three hours in the morning on the classics and three in the afternoon on the New Testament and Paley. The next day he was delighted to be informed that he had passed.

Several of his friends celebrated their examination successes by dining in each other's rooms in rotation in a weekly club commonly known as the Glutton Club. This name was proposed to ridicule another group whose Greek title meant "fond of dainties", but who dined out on "Mutton Chops, or Beans & Bacon". The Glutton Club attempted to live up to their title by experimentally dining on "birds and beasts which were before unknown to human palate" and tried hawk and bittern, but gave up after eating an old brown owl, "which was indescribable". They had more amusement from concluding each meeting with "a game of mild vingt-et-un".

Over Easter Charles stayed at Cambridge, mounting and cataloguing his beetle collection. He then became an enthusiastic member of the botany course which the "good natured & agreeable" professor Henslow taught five days a week in the Botanic Gardens and on field trips. Henslow's outings were attended by 78 men including professor Whewell. Charles became the "favourite pupil", known as "the man who walks with Henslow", helping to find specimens and to set up "practicals" dissecting plants. He became interested in pollen. One day he watched through a microscope and saw "transparent cones" emerge from the side of a geranium pollen grain. Then one burst spraying out "numberless granules". Henslow explained that the granules were indeed the constituent atoms of pollen, but they had no intrinsic vital power – life was endowed from outside and ultimately derived its power from God, whatever more "speculative" naturalists argued regarding self-activating power. Darwin had been taught otherwise by Grant, and reflected quietly on this, biding his time.

For the summer holidays Darwin arranged to meet Fox at The Mount, but Darwin's father had been ill and family tensions led to a row. Charles went off with the Revd. Hope and other friends for three weeks "entomologizing" in North Wales, hunting for beetles and trout fishing. He went partridge shooting at Maer before returning home.

=== Fourth year finals and later attitude towards mathematics ===
Back at Cambridge, his final exams loomed. A "desperate" Charles focused on his studies and got private tuition from Henslow whose subjects were mathematics and theology. This term he had to study Euclid and learn Paley's Principles of Moral and Political Philosophy, though this old text was becoming outdated. It opposed arguments for increased democracy, but saw no divine right of rule for the sovereign or the state, only "expediency". Government could be opposed if grievances outweighed the danger and expense to society. The judgement was "Every man for himself". These ideas had suited the conditions of reasonable rule prevailing when the text was published in 1785, but in 1830 they were dangerous ideas. At this time the French king was deposed by middle class republicans and given refuge in England by the Tory government. In response, radical street protests demanded suffrage, equality and freedom of religion. Then in November the Tory administration collapsed and the Whigs took over. Paley's text even supported abolition of the Thirty-nine Articles of the Anglican faith which every student at Cambridge (and Oxford University) was required to sign. Henslow insisted that "he should be grieved if a single word... was altered" and emphasised the need to respect authority. This happened even as campaigns of civil disobedience spread to starving agricultural labourers and villages close to Cambridge suffered riots and arson attacks.

In the third week of January 1831 Charles sat his final exam. There were three days of written papers covering the Classics, the two Paley texts and John Locke's An Essay Concerning Human Understanding, then mathematics and physics. At the end of the week when the results were posted he was dazed and proud to have come 10th out of a pass list of 178 doing the ordinary degree. Charles shone in theology and scraped through in the other subjects. He was also exhausted and depressed, writing to Fox "I do not know why the degree should make one so miserable." In later life he recalled Paley and Euclid being the only part of the course which was useful to him, and "By answering well the examination questions in Paley, by doing Euclid well, and by not failing miserably in Classics, I gained a good place among the οἱ πολλοί, or crowd of men who do not go in for honours."

On the specific issue of his mathematical education, Darwin came to regret his lack of ability and application: "I attempted mathematics, and even went during the summer of 1828 with a private tutor (a very dull man) to Barmouth, but I got on very slowly. The work was repugnant to me, chiefly from my not being able to see any meaning in the early steps in algebra. This impatience was very foolish, and in after years I have deeply regretted that I did not proceed far enough at least to understand something of the great leading principles of mathematics, for men thus endowed seem to have an extra sense".

=== Natural theology and geology ===
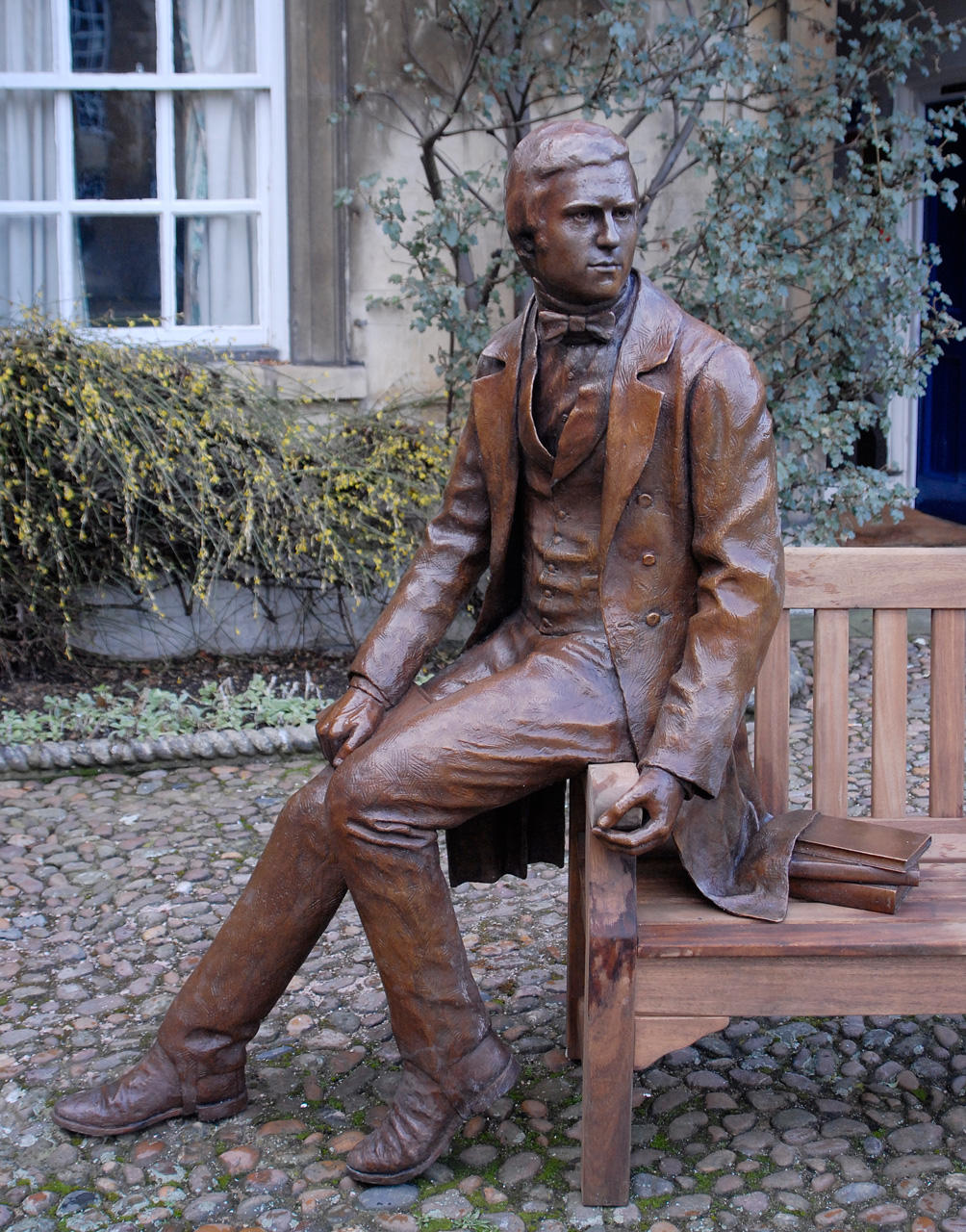
Statue of Darwin during his last months at Christ's College (age 22). Sculpted by Anthony Smith, the statue features some of the books Darwin was reading at this time; Humboldt's Personal Narrative, Paley's Natural Theology, Herschel's Preliminary Discourse on Natural Philosophy and James Stephens' Illustrations of British Entomology.

Residence requirements kept Darwin in Cambridge till June. He resumed his beetle collecting, took career advice from Henslow, and read William Paley's Natural Theology or Evidences of the Existence and Attributes of the Deity which set out to refute David Hume's argument that "design" by a Creator was merely a human projection onto the forces of nature. Paley saw a rational proof of God's existence in the complexity and perfect adaptation to needs of living beings exquisitely fitted to their places in a happy world, while attacking the evolutionary ideas of Erasmus Darwin as coinciding with atheistic schemes and lacking evidence. Paley's benevolent God acted in nature though uniform and universal laws, not arbitrary miracles or changes of laws, and this use of secondary laws provided a theodicy explaining the problem of evil by separating nature from direct divine action. This convinced Charles and encouraged his interest in science. He later wrote "I do not think I hardly ever admired a book more than Paley's Natural Theology: I could almost formerly have said it by heart."

He read John Herschel's new Preliminary Discourse on the Study of Natural Philosophy, learning that nature was governed by laws, and the highest aim of natural philosophy was to understand them through an orderly process of induction, balancing observation and theorising. This was part of the liberal Christianity of Darwin's tutors, who saw no disharmony between honest inductive science and religion. Such science was religion, and could not be heretical. Darwin also read Alexander von Humboldt's Personal Narrative, and the two books were immensely influential, stirring up in him "a burning zeal to add even the most humble contribution to the noble structure of Natural Science." As a young graduate, Henslow had geologised on the Isle of Wight and the Isle of Man, and he too had longed to visit Africa. Marriage and his position at the university now made the prospect remote, but he still had an unfulfilled ambition to "explore regions but little known, and enrich science with new species."

At home for Easter in early April, Darwin told his cousin Fox of "a scheme I have almost hatched" to visit the Canary Islands and see Tenerife as recommended by Humboldt. On returning to Cambridge, he wrote to his sister that "my head is running about the Tropics: in the morning I go and gaze at Palm trees in the hot-house and come home and read Humboldt: my enthusiasm is so great that I cannot hardly sit still on my chair. Henslow & other Dons give us great credit for our plan: Henslow promises to cram me in geology". He was studying Spanish language, and was in "a Tropical glow". Henslow introduced Darwin to the great geologist the Revd. Adam Sedgwick who had been his own tutor, and shared views on religion, politics and morals. Darwin was fired up by Sedgwick's Spring course of "equestrian outings" with its vistas of the grandeur of God's creation, so much of which was yet unexplored. He exclaimed, "What a capital hand is Sedgewick for drawing large cheques upon the Bank of Time!". When Sedgwick mentioned the effects of a local spring from a chalk hill depositing lime on twigs, Charles rode out to find the spring and threw a bush in, then later brought back the white coated spray which Sedgwick exhibited in class, inspiring others to do the same.

Darwin continued plotting his "Canary scheme", and on 11 May he told Fox "My other friends most sincerely wish me there I plague them so with talking about tropical scenery &c &c.". His father gave him "a 200£ note" to pay his college debts. In addition, "Some goodnatured Cambridge man has made me a most magnificent anonymous present of a Microscope: did ever hear of such a delightful piece of luck? one would like to know who it was, just to feel obliged to him." Darwin later found that the gift was from his friend John Herbert.

In mid June Darwin returned home to Shrewsbury, and continued "working like a tiger" for the Canary scheme, "at present Spanish & Geology, the former I find as intensely stupid, as the latter most interesting". By then his most likely companion on the trip was the tutor Marmaduke Ramsay. Darwin was "trying to make a map" of Shropshire, "but dont find it so easy as I expected." He ordered a clinometer, and on 11 July wrote to tell Henslow that it had arrived and he had tried it out in his bedroom. "As yet I have only indulged in hypotheses; but they are such powerful ones, that I suppose, if they were put into action but for one day, the world would come to an end." In efforts to learn the basics of geology he extended his mapping of strata as far away as Llanymynech, some 16 miles (26 km) from Shrewsbury, using the terminology he had learnt in Edinburgh from Robert Jameson. Already he was anxious that he had not heard from Sedgwick, and when he investigated ship sailings he found that they were only available in certain months. For this reason, the trip to Teneriffe had to be postponed to the following June, and it looked increasingly unlikely that Henslow would come on the trip. Darwin wrote to one of his student friends that he was "at present mad about Geology" and had plans to ride through Wales then meet with other students at Barmouth.

On 4 August 1831 Sedgwick arrived in his gig at The Mount, Shrewsbury, to take Charles as his assistant on a short geological expedition mapping strata in Wales. That evening Charles told of a tropical shell found in a nearby gravel pit and was impressed when Sedgwick responded that it must have been thrown away there, as it contradicted the known geology of the area. This made him realise "that science consists in grouping facts so that general laws or conclusions may be drawn from them." Sedgwick aimed to investigate and correct possible errors in George Greenough's geological map of 1820, and to trace the fossil record to the earliest times to rebut the uniformitarian ideas just published by Charles Lyell. On the morning of 5 August they went from Shrewsbury to Llangollen, and on 11 August reached Penrhyn Quarry. After less than a week of doing hard practical work Charles had learnt how to identify specimens, interpret strata and generalise from his observations. Then he went off on his own to collect samples and investigate the Vale of Clwyd, looking in vain for the Old Red Sandstone shown by Greenough. They met up in Colwyn, and Sedgwick's pleasure at the confirmation that the map was incorrect made Darwin "exceedingly proud". They went on to Capel Curig where Charles struck out on his own across 30 miles (50 km) of "some strange wild places" to Barmouth. He had parted from Sedgwick by 20 August, and travelled via Ffestiniog.

== Voyage on the Beagle ==
Arriving at Barmouth on the evening of 23 August, Charles met up with a "reading party" of Cambridge friends for a time before he left on the morning of 29 August, to go back to Shrewsbury and on to partridge shooting with his Wedgwood relatives at Maer Hall. He was grieved to have received a message that Ramsay had died. This upset Darwin's plans for a visit in the following year to Tenerife. He arrived home at The Mount, Shrewsbury, on 29 August, and found a letter from John Stevens Henslow. The Cambridge Fellow George Peacock had heard from Francis Beaufort of plans for the second survey voyage of HMS Beagle, and had written to Henslow proposing Leonard Jenyns as "a proper person to go out as a naturalist with this expedition", or if he was unavailable seeking recommendations for an alternative to take up this "glorious opportunity". When Jenyns decided not to leave his parish, he and Henslow thought of Darwin. Henslow's letter, read by Peacock and forwarded to Darwin, expected him to eagerly catch at the likely offer of a two-year trip to Terra del Fuego & home by the East Indies, not as "a finished Naturalist", but as a gentleman "amply qualified for collecting, observing, & noting any thing worthy to be noted in Natural History". The appointment was more as a companion to Captain Robert FitzRoy, than as a mere collector. Henslow wrote "I assure you I think you are the very man they are in search of".

His father thought the voyage a waste of his son's time and strongly objected. Dejected, Charles declined the offer, and went to Maer for the partridge shooting with a note from his father to "Uncle Jos" Wedgwood. This contained a prescription for a bowel ailment and a note saying that Charles had quite given up the proposed "voyage of discovery", but "if you think differently from me I shall wish him to follow your advice." Charles' hopes were revived by this unexpected news, and his relatives came out in favour of the voyage. He outlined his father's objections, and sat up that night drafting a reply with his uncle. Jos wrote suggesting that Charles would be likely to "acquire and strengthen, habits of application", and "Natural History... is very suitable to a Clergyman." Though "useless as regards his profession", for "a man of enlarged curiosity, it affords him such an opportunity of seeing men and things as happens to few". The Admiralty would look after him well, but "you & Charles... must decide." Charles begged "one favour... a decided answer, yes or no." This reply was sent post-haste early on the morning of 1 September and Charles went shooting. About 10 o'clock he received word from his uncle that they should go to The Mount at once. When they arrived a few hours later, Charles' father had decided that he would give "all the assistance in my power".
