= Sociology of punishment =

Branch of sociology

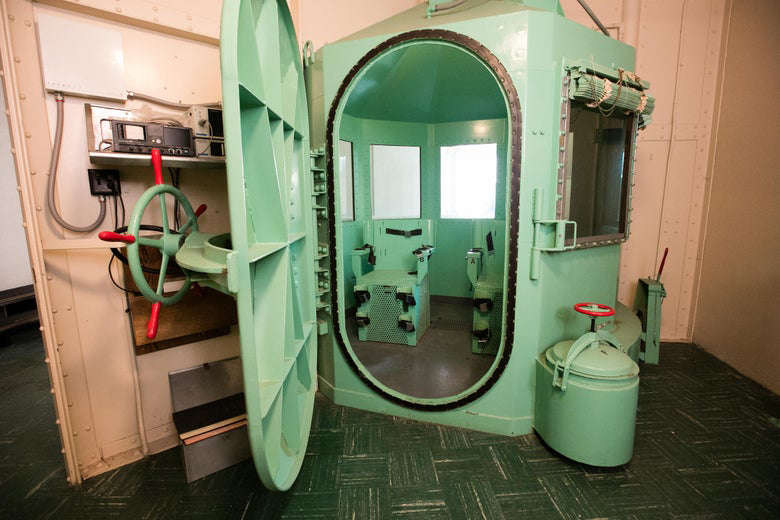
The gas chamber that was located in San Quentin State Prison in San Quentin, California, US. The chamber was dismantled in 2019 when Governor Gavin Newsom issued a moratorium on capital punishment in California and ordered the execution sites to be dismantled.

The sociology of punishment seeks to understand why and how we punish. Punishment involves the intentional infliction of pain and/or the deprivation of rights and liberties. Sociologists of punishment usually examine state-sanctioned acts in relation to law-breaking; for instance, why citizens give consent to the legitimation of acts of violence.

Two of the most common political and ethical motivations for formal punishment are utilitarianism and retributivism. Both these concepts have been articulated by law-makers and law-enforcers, but may be seen as descriptive rather than explanative. Sociologists note that although attempts of justification are made in terms of these principles, this does not fully explain why violent punitive acts occur. Social psychology and symbolic interactionism often inform theory and method in this area.

== Retributivism ==
Retributivism covers all theories that justify punishment because the offender deserves it. This is interpreted in two ways, either:

- a person must be punished because they deserve it (deserving is a sufficient reason for punishment), or
- a person must not be punished unless they deserve it (deserving is a necessary but not sufficient condition for punishment).

Retributive theories usually put forward that deserving is a sufficient reason for punishment.

The main strands of retributivism are:

- Intrinsic Retribution: Offender deserves punishment because there is intrinsic good in the guilty suffering.
- Lex Talionis: To restore the balance between offender and victim.
- Unfair Advantage Principle: To restore the balance by the imposition of extra burdens on those who have usurped more than their fair share of benefits. (Note the focus of Lex Talionis is on what others have lost, the focus of the unfair advantage principle is on what the offender gained.)
- Hegelian Retribution: Punishment annuls the wrong done.
- Liability: The offender had knowledge that he would be punished if he committed the acts, and he, therefore, deserves punishment if he does it.
- Social Contract Theory: We make a contract to give up certain rights in order for other rights to be protected, when we break that contract we deserve to have our rights taken away.
- Grievance Theory: The offender has caused a grievance for the victim, and the punishment of the offender will satisfy the victim, and make up for that grievance (although proposed as a form of retribution, it is questionable as to whether it really is retributivist in principle)

The nature of desert means that the offender must be blameworthy and that an offender deserves punishment simply because he has offended, and so his punishment must relate to his wrongdoing. It can, therefore, be said to be backward-looking.

The theory of retributivism does propose a number of purposes of punishment: to restore the balance (whether according to Lex Talionis or the Unfair Advantage Principle), to openly and emphatically denounce crime, or to provide satisfaction. The principles of distribution can be derived from these purposes.

There are 3 main methods for deciding on punishment.

- The first is in accordance with Lex Talionis; that punishment should be equal or equivalent to the crime.
- The second is the culpability principle; that punishment should be in proportion to the harmfulness and blameworthiness of an offender's actions.
- The third is in accordance with the grievance principle; that punishment should give satisfaction equal to the grievances caused.

=== Critique of retributivism ===
The above explanations for deciding on punishment raise a few issues:

- The idea of equal or equivalent punishment, however, proves to be impractical. How can the equivalent of sexual assault be found in any current punishment?
- To decide on punishment in terms of satisfaction in accordance with grievances caused is also questionable. Honderich [1989:34] says that punishment is not wholly justified and liberalized in terms of the offence, but provides “the contention that a man’s punishment must provide satisfactions”. However, if punishment is not wholly dependent on the offence, but is in part to do with satisfaction, then it is in part, consequentialist (and therefore not retributive).
- The culpability principle is often used in deciding the punishment of offenders. However, there are large numbers of punishments handed down which do not obey this principle. Particularly, this is the case where the harmfulness and blameworthiness of offender's actions are not proportionate to the punishment. For example, in Australia the punishment for speeding up to 30 km over the legal speed limit is 3 demerit points. The punishment for a passenger of your vehicle not wearing their seatbelt is 3 demerit points. According to the retributivist explanation of punishment, two offences that have the same punishment should be fairly similar in terms of the harmfulness and blameworthiness. However, in this example it can be seen that this is not the case.

Therefore, it can be seen that retributivist theories are not adequate to explain why and how we punish.

Retributivism as a justification for punishment can be seen to fall under the category of a Theory of the Right rather than a Theory of the Good.

== Utilitarianism ==
Utilitarianism covers all theories that justify the evil of punishment only when that punishment has some utility. It is therefore forward looking, and consequentialist in nature [Baker, 1971:69], as it holds the belief that, ultimately, the only morally significant features of an act are the good and bad consequences produced by it.

The word utility has been used to justify punishment in two different ways in utilitarian writing:

- Use: that punishment is only justified when it has some use – that is, preventing further crime [Lessnoff, 1971:141].
- Value: that punishment is only justified when it is most conducive to the welfare of society [Ten, 1987:3], that is, the value society gains from the punishment is more than the disadvantages incurred by the offender.

However most utilitarians agree that not only must punishment have both use and value, but also that there be no other solution that would deter as effectively with less distress [Honderich 1989:59].

While utilitarianists may slightly disagree on why the evil of punishment can be justified, authors agree that the purpose of punishment is to reduce crime. This purpose directly relates to the principle of distribution of utilitarianism. Most utilitarianists agree that there are three ways to reduce crime: incapacitation, deterrence and reform.

There are 2 main types of prevention: specific and general prevention. Specific prevention is aimed at the offender him/herself whilst general prevention is aimed at the public in general.

Specific Prevention

Wright [1982] in his discussion of Utilitarianism, describes three main goals of individual prevention.

- “Firstly”, he begins “imprisonment deters [the] individual from committing crime” [p. 26]. So one reason for sending the offender to prison for a crime, is to make him less likely to commit further crimes through fear of more imprisonment.
- “Secondly”, he continues, “prison is...to protect the public from certain offenders” [p. 27]. So his second reason is we send offenders to prison to render them incapable of committing crimes.
- Thirdly, he concludes, “prisons [are]...to rehabilitate”. So we send offenders to prison to rehabilitate them, so that they no longer need to commit crimes. There is some debate about this third point, with some authors following the above example, focusing on rehabilitation as the third goal [Braithwaite & Petit, 1990:4; Bean, 1981:44; Walker, 1994:212], others quoting reform [Bentham in Honderich, 1989:51; Mabbot in Acton, 1969:17], and still others mistakenly using the two words interchangeably.

General Prevention

General prevention uses the punishment of the offender to prevent others from committing crimes. It has been argued that sending an offender to prison has three effects.

- Firstly through fear of suffering a similar fate to the offender, the general public is deterred from committing similar crimes [Lessnoff, 1971:141].
- Secondly, by sending an offender to prison, a proclamation is issued specifying that it is morally wrong to disobey the law.
- Lastly, “with fear or moral influence as the intermediate link...unconscious inhibitions against crime...establishes a condition of habitual lawfulness” [Andenaes, 1974:8].

A number of issues are associated with the utilitarian justification of punishment:

- Firstly, utilitarianism allows for innocents to be punished. Moberly [1968:44] states that utilitarianism can account for “when no direct partaker of the crime can be apprehended, other people may be punished in his stead”.
- Secondly, the utilitarian justification of punishment as an investment does not uphold the claim of punishment to be “something more and other” [Moberly, 1968:70] than burdens such as quarantine and war imposed by the state. Moberly argues that it cannot, as this claim is only upheld when an essential attribute of punishment is that it relates to transgression of a law, and therefore the crime committed.

Utilitarianism as a justification for punishment can be seen to fall under the category of a Theory of the Good rather than a Theory of the Right.

=== Critique of utilitarianism ===
If utilitarian justifications of punishment were sound, then one would expect to find certain conditions met by those who are punished. Looking specifically at imprisonment, one would conclude that the people in our prisons are dangerous or have a long criminal record (and are therefore in need of capacitation), that the amount of recidivism is low (as offenders will have been deterred from committing future crimes) and that there will be programs for rehabilitation and opportunities for reform in place.

However a NSW Prison Report found that:

- 13% of inmates have an intellectual disability [p. 20]
- at the point of sentencing, indigenous persons are sentenced to imprisonment at about 10 times the rate expected given their relative population size [p. 21]
  - of the above, 50% of crimes fell into theft, driving or offences against justice [p. 22]
- 50% of offences resulting in imprisonment over 58% were for non-violent crimes [p. 28]
- 14,154 (37%) out of a total of 38,626 persons who spent some time in full custody between June 1995 and June 1999, have been to prison at least once before, and almost half of those (18%) have been at least twice. [p. 31]
- “the majority of prisoners who pass through the system serve sentences of less than 6 months and are in minimum security or serving periodic detention. [p.32]

From these and other statistics, researchers [including Wright, 1982; Sutherland & Cressey, 1960; Melossi, 1998; Rusche, 1998; Duff, 1994; Carlen, 1994] and Mann, 1995] have suggested utilitarian justifications cannot be overwhelming assumed from the studied data. One conclusion that can and is often drawn from prison statistics, however, is that:

Whatever regional and national differences there might be in opinions about which offences deserve custody, the poor, the disturbed, the migrant, [and] disadvantaged ethnic minorities are consistently over-penalised and over-imprisoned. [Hudson, 1993:3]

What then is the reason that we imprison these people? Utilitarianists have no answer.

== Marxist theories of punishment ==
These theories offer explanations as to why we imprison offenders not with claims of crime preventions, but that it is done with the goal of controlling those groups “whose socially disadvantaged position makes them volatile, disaffected and thus threatening”, Duff, 1994:306].

Criminal conduct is not a lower class monopoly, but is distributed throughout the various classes. But as has been shown, the same is not true of the distribution of punishment, which falls, overwhelmingly and systematically, on the poor and the disadvantaged. Discriminatory decision-making throughout the whole criminal justice system ensures that the socially advantaged are routinely filtered out: they are given the benefit of the doubt, or are defined as good risks, or simply have access to the best legal advice. Serious, deep-end punishments such as imprisonment are predominantly reserved for the unemployed, the poor, the homeless, the mentally ill, the addicted, and those who lack social support and personal assets. Increasingly, this class bias had taken on a racial complexion, as disadvantaged minority groups come to be massively over-represented in the prison population., Duff, 1994:306] The benefits of using a marxist framework to answer this question is that it allows us to understand why offenders from the working class are imprisoned and offenders from the middle/upper classes are not. Marxist theory is based upon the idea of class struggle and ideology. Important to our understanding of imprisonment are the two concepts of hegemony and relative autonomy. Hegemony is in simple terms leadership with the consent of the led (that is leadership that is considered by those who are led to be the legitimate exercise of leadership).

Marxist theories tells us then, that the reason we imprison offenders is to control those who are a threat to dominant values.

== See also ==
- Theory of criminal justice
- Punishment
- Criminology
- Sociology of deviance
- Sociology of law
- Sociology of military
