= Carbasea elegans =

Scientific classification
- Kingdom: Animalia
- Phylum: Bryozoa
- Class: Gymnolaemata
- Order: Cheilostomatida
- Family: Flustridae
- Genus: Carbasea
- Species: C. elegans

Binomial name
- Carbasea elegans Busk, 1852

Species of moss animal

Carbasea elegans is a species of bryozoans in the family Flustridae found in Australia.
