= Chartella =

Scientific classification
- Kingdom: Animalia
- Phylum: Bryozoa
- Class: Gymnolaemata
- Order: Cheilostomatida
- Family: Flustridae
- Genus: Chartella; Gray, 1848

Genus of bryozoans

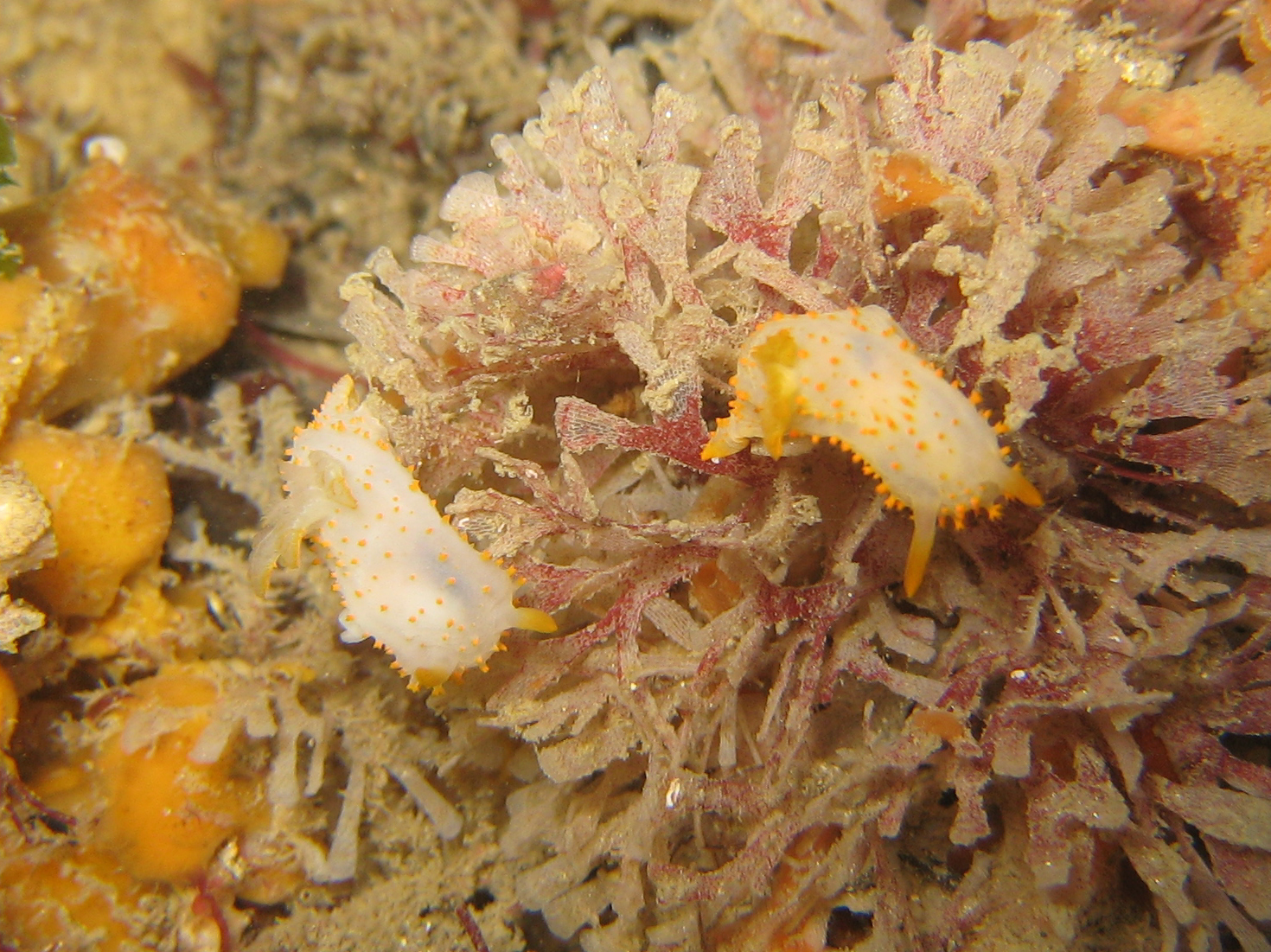
Couple of Crimora papillata eating Chartella papyracea in Carantec

Chartella is a genus of bryozoans belonging to the family Flustridae.

The genus has an almost cosmopolitan distribution.

== Species ==
The following species are recognised in the genus Chartella:

- Chartella elongata Cook, 1968
- Chartella notialis Hayward & Winston, 1994
- Chartella papyracea (Ellis & Solander, 1786)
- Chartella papyrea (Pallas, 1766)
- Chartella tenella (Hincks, 1887)
