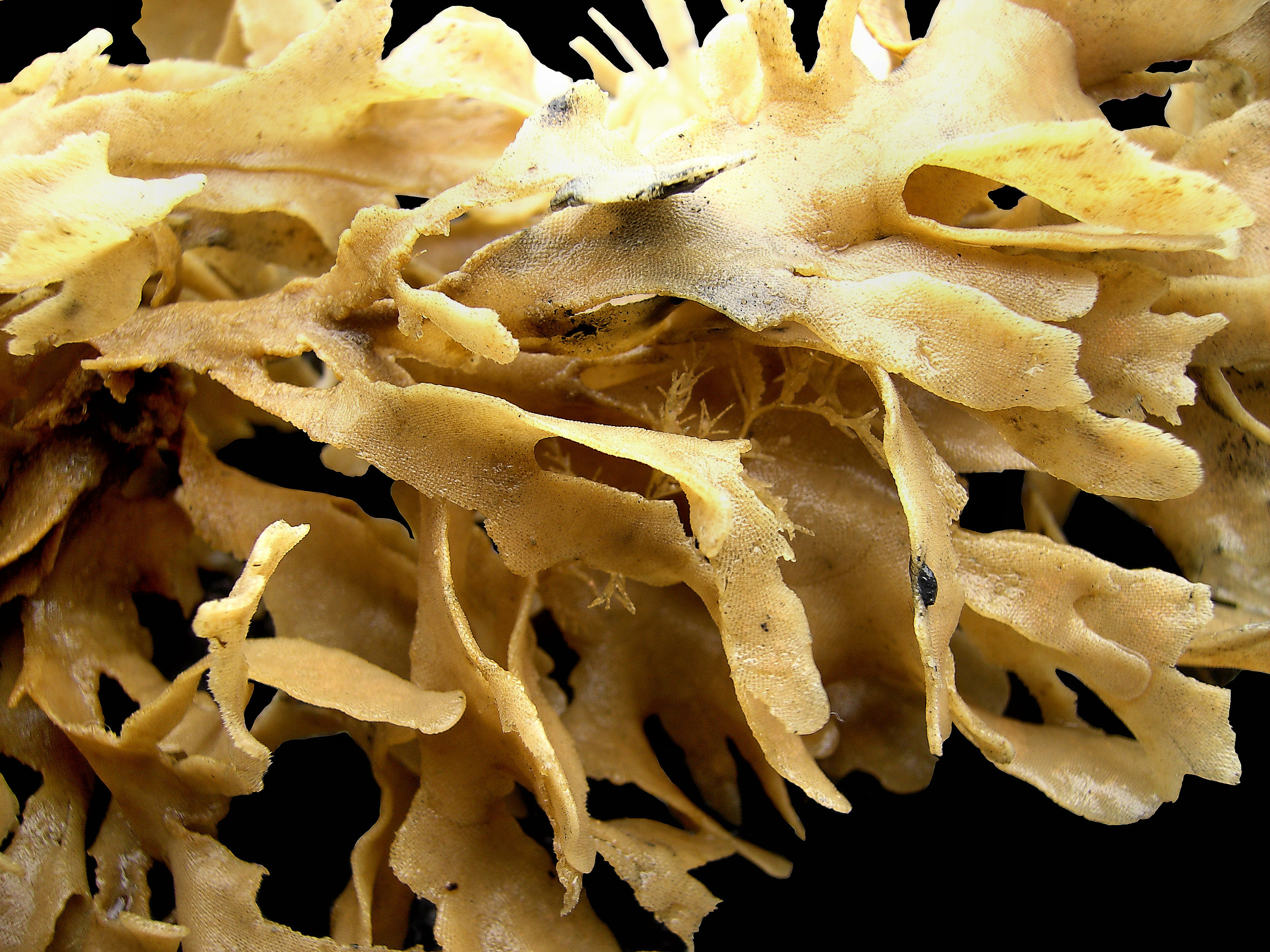
- Flustra foliacea

Scientific classification
- Kingdom: Animalia
- Phylum: Bryozoa
- Class: Gymnolaemata
- Order: Cheilostomatida
- Family: Flustridae
- Genus: Flustra; Linnaeus, 1761

Type species
- Flustra foliacea (Linnaeus, 1758)

Species
- See text.

Synonyms
- Escara Pallas, 1766; Eschara Linnaeus, 1758

= Flustra =

Genus of bryozoans

Flustra is a genus of bryozoans belonging to the family Flustridae. The genus has a cosmopolitan distribution.

== Species ==
Many formerly included species have been moved to different taxa. The following species are currently recognised:

- Flustra anguloavicularis Kluge, 1961
- Flustra digitata Packard, 1867
- Flustra foliacea (Linnaeus, 1758)
- Flustra italica Spallanzani, 1801
- Flustra nordenskjoldi Kluge, 1929
- Flustra pedunculata (Busk, 1884)
- Flustra separata Waters, 1888
- †Flustra sexagona Mokrinskiji, 1916
