= Securiflustra =

Scientific classification
- Kingdom: Animalia
- Phylum: Bryozoa
- Class: Gymnolaemata
- Order: Cheilostomatida
- Family: Flustridae
- Genus: Securiflustra; Silén, 1941

Genus of bryozoans

Securiflustra is a genus of bryozoans belonging to the family Flustridae.

The species of this genus are found in Europe, North America, and southernmost South America.

== Species ==
There are two species recognised in the genus Securiflustra:

- Securiflustra bifoliata (d'Hondt, 1981)
- Securiflustra securifrons (Pallas, 1766)
