= Edinburgh Philosophical Journal =

The Edinburgh Philosophical Journal was founded by its editors, Robert Jameson and David Brewster in 1819 as a scientific journal to publish articles on the latest science of the day. In 1826 the two editors fell out, and Jameson continued publication as the Edinburgh New Philosophical Journal. Jameson died in 1854, and his place as editor was then taken over by Thomas Anderson, Sir William Jardine, John Hutton Balfour and, for America, Henry Darwin Rogers. In 1864 it was merged into the Quarterly Journal of Science, London.

The Edinburgh Philosophical Journal was published by Archibald Constable and Company, then in 1826 publication of the Edinburgh New Philosophical Journal was taken on by Adam Black, later A & C Black of Edinburgh. The journal covered emerging scientific developments in chemistry, optics, electricity, magnetism, and natural history, as well as related topics including practical mechanics, inventions, and scientific instruments. As well as articles by the editors, it published contributions by many of the leading scientists at the time, including Charles Babbage, John Herschel, Robert Stevenson, William Scoresby, Alexander Humboldt and Humphry Davy.

It was one of the publishing options for the Royal Society of Edinburgh, and after 1839 it published proceedings of the Wernerian Natural History Society.
