= Carbasea =

Scientific classification
- Kingdom: Animalia
- Phylum: Bryozoa
- Class: Gymnolaemata
- Order: Cheilostomatida
- Family: Flustridae
- Genus: Carbasea; Gray, 1848

Synonyms
- Flustrina van Beneden, 1849

Genus of moss animals

Carbasea is a genus of marine bryozoans in the family Flustridae.

== Species ==
The following species are recognised in the genus Carbasea:

- Carbasea capitata Canu & Bassler, 1928
- Carbasea carbasea (Ellis & Solander, 1786)
- Carbasea curva (Kluge, 1914)
- Carbasea desbruyeresi d'Hondt & Redier, 1977
- Carbasea elegans Busk, 1852
- Carbasea indivisa Busk, 1852
- Carbasea laterogranulata d'Hondt & Gordon, 1999
- Carbasea linguiformis Harmer, 1926
- Carbasea macropora Hasenbank, 1932
- Carbasea mawatari Gontar, 1993
- Carbasea mediocris Hayward & Cook, 1979
- Carbasea meridionalis Liu, 1982
- Carbasea orientalis Liu, 1982
- Carbasea ovoidea Busk, 1852
- Carbasea pisciformis Busk, 1852
- Carbasea sinica Liu, 1982
- Carbasea solanderi Norman, 1903
