= Filippo Cavolini =

Italian marine biologist (1756–1810)

Filippo Cavolini (8 April 1756 – 15 March 1810) was an Italian marine biologist.

Filippo Cavolini was born in Vico Equense, the son of Nicola Cavolini, a Neapolitan lawyer, and Angela Auriemma, and left a legal career to devote himself to natural history. He became the Professor of Zoology at the University of Naples and Director of the Zoological Museum. His research style, similar to that of Lazzaro Spallanzani, led to important results in the arena of marine biology and botany (Memorie per servire alla storia de' polipi marini -1785- Memoria per servire alla generazione dei pesci e dei granchi - 1787). He died following an assault by a soldier while he was researching by boat in the Gulf of Naples: he fell into the sea and died in Naples a few days later from pneumonia. The opisthobranch family Cavoliniidae honours his name.
