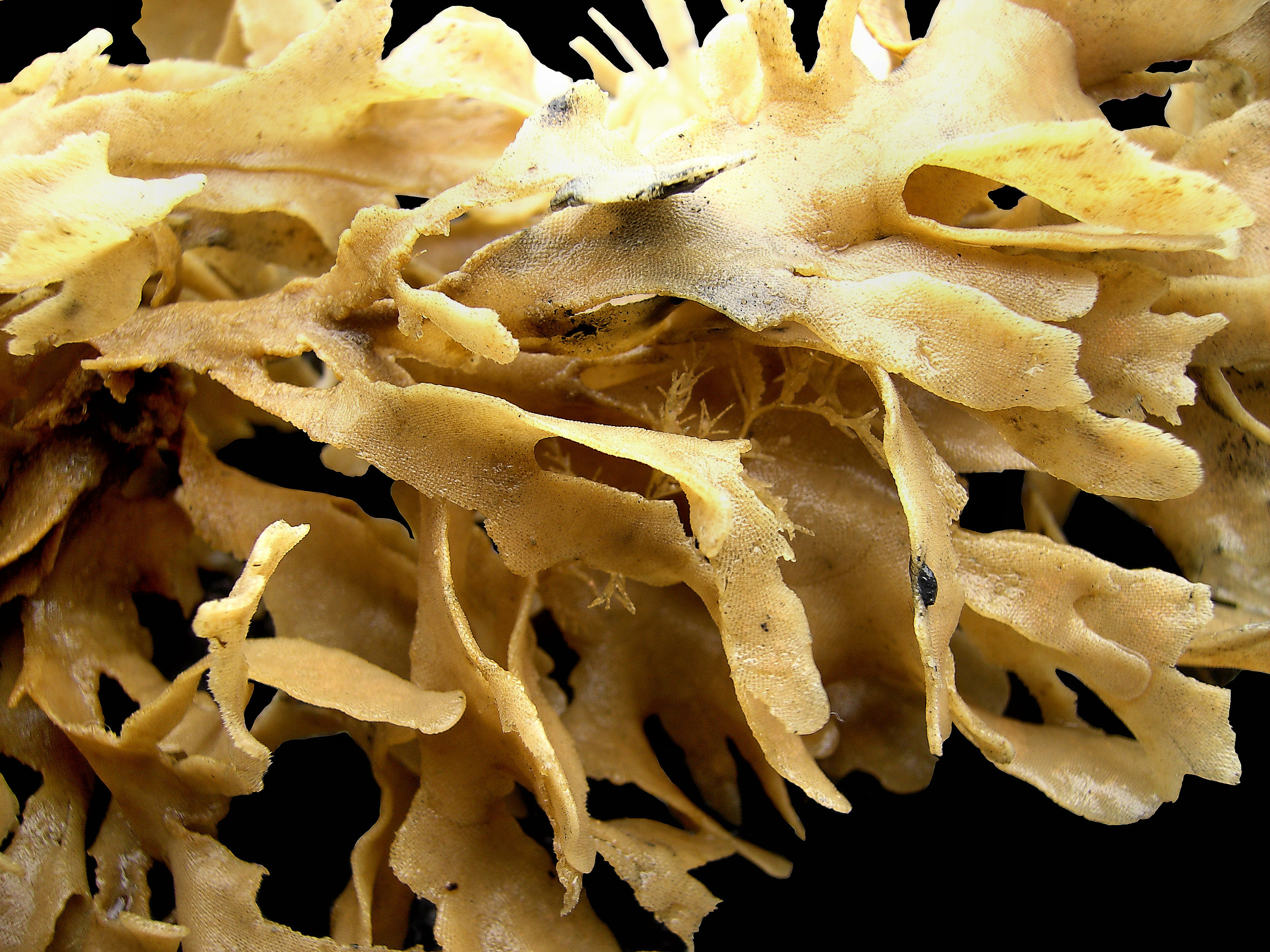
- Colony of Flustra foliacea

Scientific classification
- Kingdom: Animalia
- Phylum: Bryozoa
- Class: Gymnolaemata
- Order: Cheilostomatida
- Suborder: Flustrina
- Superfamily: Flustroidea; Fleming, 1828
- Family: Flustridae; Fleming, 1828

Synonyms
- Hincksinidae Canu & Bassler, 1925

= Flustridae =

Family of moss animals

Flustridae is a family of bryozoans in the suborder Flustrina.

== Genera ==
The following genera are recognised in the family Flustridae:

- Carbasea Gray, 1848
- Chartella Gray, 1848
- Cribralaria Silén, 1941
- Flustra Linnaeus, 1761
- Gontarella Grischenko, Taylor & Mawatari, 2002
- Gregarinidra Barroso, 1949
- Hincksina Norman, 1903
- Hincksinoflustra Bobin & Prenant, 1961
- Isosecuriflustra Liu & Hu, 1991
- Kenella Levinsen, 1909
- Nematoflustra Moyano, 1972
- Retiflustra Levinsen, 1909
- Sarsiflustra Jullien, 1903
- Securiflustra Silén, 1941
- Serratiflustra Moyano, 1972
- Spiralaria Busk, 1861
- Terminoflustra Silén, 1941
