= Theory of criminal justice =

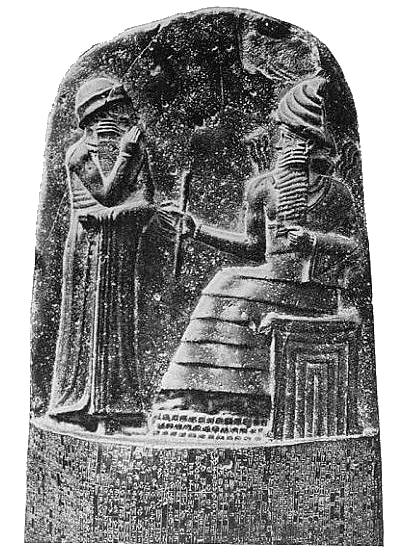
The upper part of the stela of Hammurapis' code of laws

The theory of criminal justice is the branch of philosophy of law that deals with criminal justice and in particular punishment. The theory of criminal justice has deep connections to other areas of philosophy, such as political philosophy and ethics, as well as to criminal justice in practice.

== Justice and criminal justice ==
=== Distinction from general justice ===
Typically, legal theorists and philosophers consider four distinct kinds of justice: corrective justice, distributive justice, procedural justice, and retributive justice. Corrective justice is the idea that liability rectifies the injustice one person inflicts upon another (found in modern day contract law). Distributive justice seeks to appropriately distribute pleasure and pain between the offender and the victim by punishing the offender. Procedural justice focuses on the fairness in the processes that punish criminals. Retributive justice is perhaps best captured by the phrase lex talionis (the principle of "an eye for an eye"), which traces back to the Code of Hammurabi.

Criminal law generally falls under retributive justice, a theory of justice that considers proportionate punishment a morally acceptable response to crime. The principle of lex talionis received its most well known philosophical defense from Immanuel Kant, though scholarly analysis reveals Kant's theory incorporated both retributive and deterrent elements. A crime being committed constitutes for a retributive punishment; however to do so risks the threat of punishment serving as a deterrent to counteract thus drives toward violating others' rights.

The retributive theory was developed further by Georg Wilhelm Friedrich Hegel through his dialectical approach, where crime is conceptualized as a negation of right, and punishment as the negation of the negation that annuls this criminal act. However, recent philosophical scholarship has shown that Hegel's system is more complex than simple retributivism would suggest. In particular, his wider philosophy, no less than his treatment of confession and forgiveness in the Phenomenology of Spirit, provides philosophical grounding for restorative justice approaches bringing offenders and victims together in order to heal wounds that crime has caused. This interpretation situates punishment within Hegel's concept of ethical life, incorporating considerations of prevention, rehabilitation, and moral reconciliation alongside retribution.

Criminal law is no longer considered a purely retributive undertaking; deterrence figures prominently in the justification of the practice and in the rules themselves.

== See also ==
- Marginal deterrence
