= Julian Trevelyan =

English artist and poet

Julian Trevelyan RA
- Born: Julian Otto Trevelyan; 20 February 1910; Dorking, Surrey, England
- Died: 12 July 1988 (aged 78); Hammersmith, London, England
- Education: Bedales School; Trinity College, Cambridge; Stanley William Hayter, Atelier 17
- Known for: Etching; printmaking; painting; teaching; writing; camouflage
- Notable work: Thames Suite (1969)
- Movement: British Surrealist Group
- Spouses: Ursula Darwin (m. 1934; div. 1950) Mary Fedden (m. 1951)
- Elected: Royal Academician (19 May 1986)

Julian Otto Trevelyan RA (20 February 1910 – 12 July 1988) was an English artist and poet.

== Early life ==
Trevelyan was the only child to survive to adulthood of Robert Calverley Trevelyan and his wife Elizabeth van der Hoeven. His grandfather was the liberal politician Sir George Trevelyan, 2nd Baronet, and his uncle the historian George Macaulay Trevelyan; he is the great-uncle of his namesake, Julian Trevelyan the pianist.

Julian Trevelyan was educated at Bedales School and Trinity College, Cambridge, where he read English Literature.

== Artistic career ==
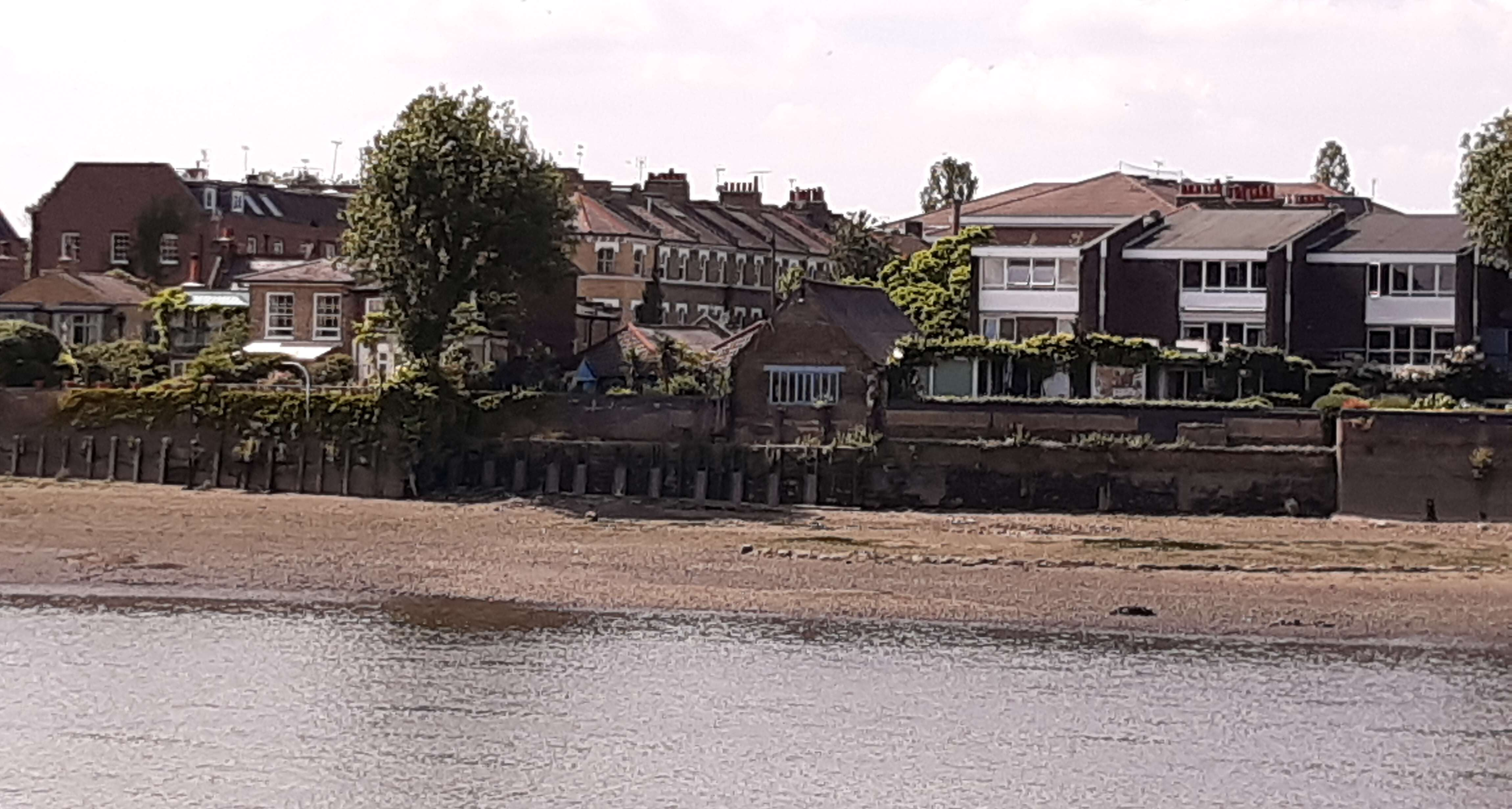
Durham Wharf and St Peter's Wharf, Hammersmith, the homes of Trevelyan and of Mary Fedden

He moved to Paris to become an artist, enrolling at Atelier Dix-Sept, Stanley William Hayter's engraving school, where he learned etching. He worked alongside artists including Max Ernst, Oskar Kokoschka, Joan Miró and Pablo Picasso.

In 1935, Trevelyan bought Durham Wharf, beside the river Thames in Hammersmith, London. This became his home and studio for the rest of his life and was a source of artistic inspiration to him. He became a confirmed Surrealist and exhibited at the International Surrealist Exhibition, held at the New Burlington Galleries in London.

From 1950 to 1955, Trevelyan taught history of art and etching at the Chelsea School of Art.

From 1955 to 1963, Trevelyan worked at the Royal College of Art and became Head of the Etching Department. Because of his enthusiasm in his work and the desire to share it with others, Trevelyan became a highly influential teacher, with students including David Hockney, Ron Kitaj and Norman Ackroyd. He was an important leader of modern print techniques and today is regarded as a silent driving force behind the etching revolution of the 1960s.

In 1969, he produced the Thames Suite, a collection of 12 views of the Thames from its upper reaches in Oxford and Henley-on-Thames down to the tidal stretches of London and the Estuary.

== Wartime camoufleur ==
Along with other artists such as Roland Penrose, during the Second World War, Trevelyan served as a Camouflage Officer. He was a member of the Royal Engineers from 1940 to 1943, serving in North Africa and Palestine.

You cannot hide anything in the desert.

Arriving in the "Western Desert" town of Tobruk, North Africa, Trevelyan realized that standard British army green and brown splotches were ineffective as desert camouflage. He and the other camoufleurs, working under Hugh Cott and Geoffrey Barkas, became expert at desert camouflage and deception. By 1942, they were able to deceive the German Afrika Korps, creating a dummy army which successfully tied down German forces, while real tanks were concealed or disguised as trucks and other equipment.

== Awards and distinctions ==
In July 1986, Trevelyan was awarded a senior fellowship at the Royal College of Art and in September 1987 he was appointed a Royal Academician.

== Family ==
He married the potter Ursula Darwin, daughter of Bernard Darwin and his wife Elinor (née Monsall) on 30 July 1934. She was a great-granddaughter of Charles Darwin; their marriage was dissolved in 1950. Their son is the film-maker Philip Trevelyan.

Trevelyan's second wife was the painter Mary Fedden; they married in 1951.

Trevelyan died on 12 July 1988 in Hammersmith, London.

== Works and exhibitions ==
Trevelyan's first solo exhibition was at the Lefevre Gallery in 1937.

His work has been exhibited at Waddington Galleries (commissioned a series of etchings), New Grafton Gallery, Bohun Gallery, River and Rowing Museum in Henley-on-Thames, the Bloomsbury Gallery, Messum's, the New Burlington Galleries in London, and Pallant House Gallery, Chichester, among other places.

In 1998 a major Retrospective "Julian Trevelyan: The Imaginative Impulse" was held at the Royal College of Art which subsequently toured to Royal West of England Academy, Bristol; Laing Gallery Newcastle, and Mercer Art Gallery, Harrogate with accompanying catalogue published by Bohun. Catalogue Raisonne of Prints edited by Silvie Turner launched at Royal Academy.. 'Julian Trevelyan Retrospective of Etchings' at Bohun Gallery with opening of River & Rowing Museum mounting 'Julian Trevelyan: River Thames Etchings'.

To celebrate the centenary of his birth, an exhibition of his prints was held at Pallant House Gallery in Chichester from 10 May to 13 June 2010.

Bohun Gallery handles the artist's estate, and stages regular exhibitions of his paintings and etchings.

105 of his artworks are now held in the collection of the Tate Gallery.

Trevelyan recorded some of his experiences in his book Indigo Days, MacGibbon and Kee, London, 1957.

Bohun Gallery held a major retrospective of the artist's work "Julian Trevelyan: Picture Language" 23 April - 1 June 2013, which included previously unseen paintings and etchings. The exhibition launched the new monograph on Julian Trevelyan, written by his son Philip Trevelyan.
