= Wilfred Wood (disambiguation) =

Wilfred Wood (1897–1982) was a British soldier awarded the Victoria Cross.

Wilfred Wood or Wilfrid Wood may also refer to:

- Wilfred Wood (bishop) (born 1936), Bishop of Croydon in the Church of England
- Wilfrid Wood (1888–1976), British painter
- Wilfrid Wood (sculptor) (born 1968), British sculptor

== See also ==
- Wilfrid Woods (1906–1975), British naval officer
