= GCMA =

GCMA may refer to:

- Golf Club Managers' Association, a British professional organization
- Greenville County Museum of Art, South Carolina, United States
- Groupement de Commandos Mixtes Aéroportés, a unit within the French counter-intelligence service active during the Cold War
