= John Norris Wood =

British illustrator

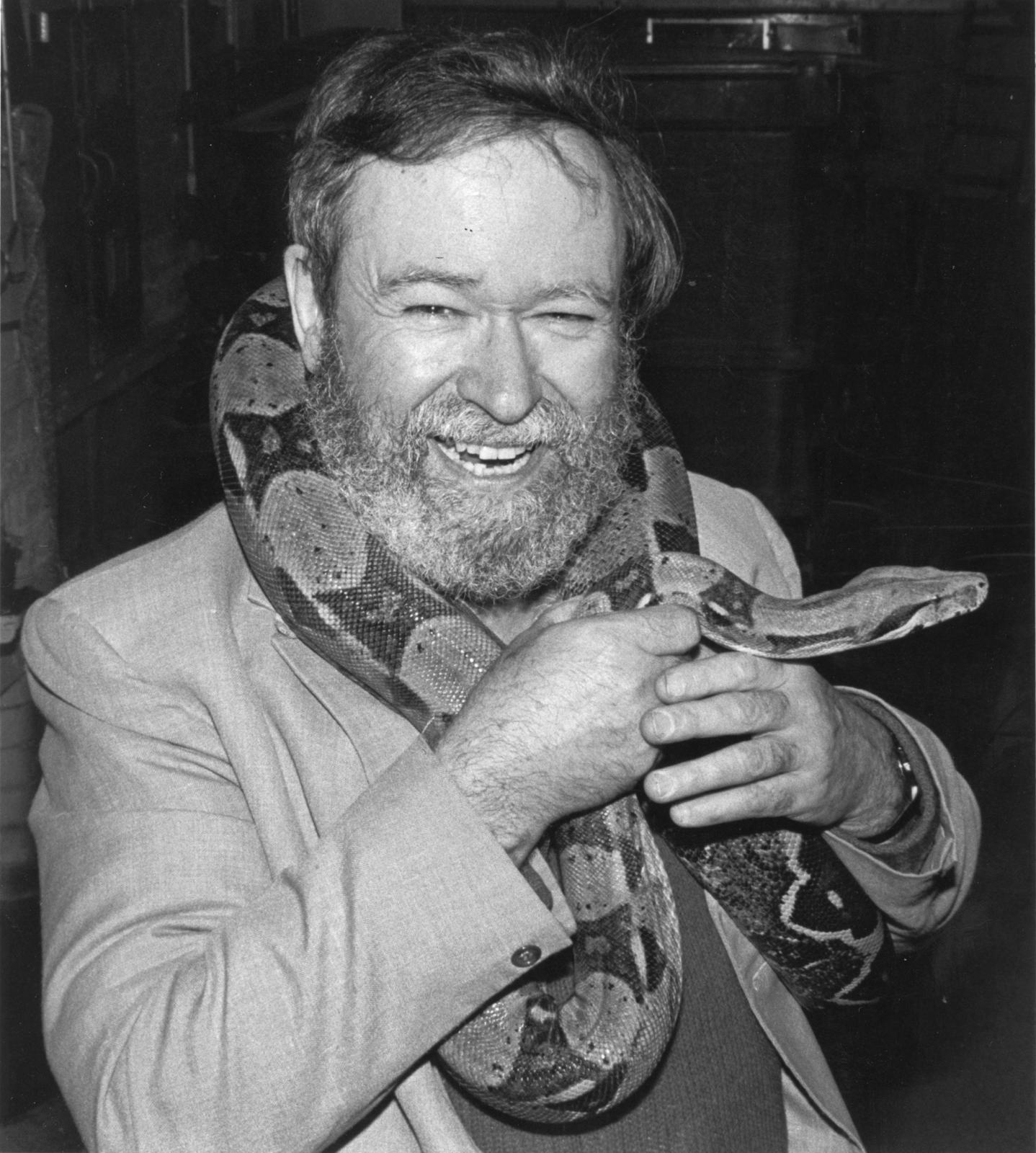
- Wood with a python
- Born: November 29, 1930; London
- Died: October 17, 2015 (aged 84)
- Citizenship: British
- Education: Bryanston School, Goldsmiths College, Royal College of Art, East Anglian School of Painting and Drawing
- Occupations: Royal College of Art, Goldsmiths College, Cambridge School of Art, Hornsey College of Art
- Known for: Natural history illustrator, artist, printmaker and teacher
- Spouse: Julie Guyatt
- Children: Wilfrid Wood (artist), Dinah Wood

John Norris Wood (29 November 1930 – 17 October 2015) was a British natural history illustrator, printmaker, teacher, and conservationist. He founded the Natural History Illustration and Ecological Studies course at the Royal College of Art, London.

== Early life and education ==
Wood was born in London on 29 November 1930. His father, Wilfrid Burton Wood, a pioneering physician and his mother Lucy, encouraged his early interest in nature. He attended Bryanston School, Dorset, where his art master introduced him to Edward Bawden. Wood went on to study painting and illustration at Goldsmiths’ College School of Art from 1950 to 1953 where he was taught by Samuel Rabin and Betty Swanwick. From 1955 - 1958, Wood specialized in printmaking and zoological illustration at the Royal College of Art (RCA). His tutors at RCA included Edward Ardizzone, Edward Bawden and John Minton. Wood also trained at the East Anglian School of Painting and Drawing at Benton End run by Cedric Morris and Arthur Lett-Haines. Wood later contributed to Benton End Remembered (2002) in which he recalled, "It was a place full of fun (if not a little cantankerousness) which placed art at the centre of things and assumed that artists were really important and necessary to society. The garden was full of the best flowers imaginable, especially bearded irises, and was an Eden to me, warm, protected and complete with European tree frogs which Cedric had imported and which especially delighted me."

== Life and career ==
In 1966, Wood designed a set of Royal Mail postage stamps depicting British birds, bringing his work to a wide public audience. His illustrations were used by Natural History Museum and London Zoo.

In 1971, on the invitation of Robin Darwin, great-grandson to Charles Darwin and rector of the Royal College of Art, Wood established the Natural History Illustration and Ecological Studies course, the first of its kind at an art school. Wood was later made a fellow and a professor at the RCA.

His illustrations appeared in scientific publications and children’s book like Nature Hide and Seek series. Wood was a consultant to the BBC's Life on Earth series in 1979.

Exhibitions of his work were held at the Victoria and Albert Museum, the Natural History Museum, the Royal Academy of Arts, the Fry Art Gallery (2001), the Chappel Galleries (2002), and the Museum of Zoology at the University of Cambridge (2004).

Wood married Julie Guyatt in 1962; the couple had two children, Dinah Wood and sculptor Wilfrid Wood. He lived for many years on a nature reserve he created with his family in East Sussex. John Norris Wood died on 17 October 2015 in Kent at the age of 84.

== Works ==
Nature Hide & Seek: Jungles

Nature Hide & Seek: Rivers and Lakes

Nature Hide & Seek: Woods and Forests

Nature Hide & Seek: Oceans

== Gallery ==
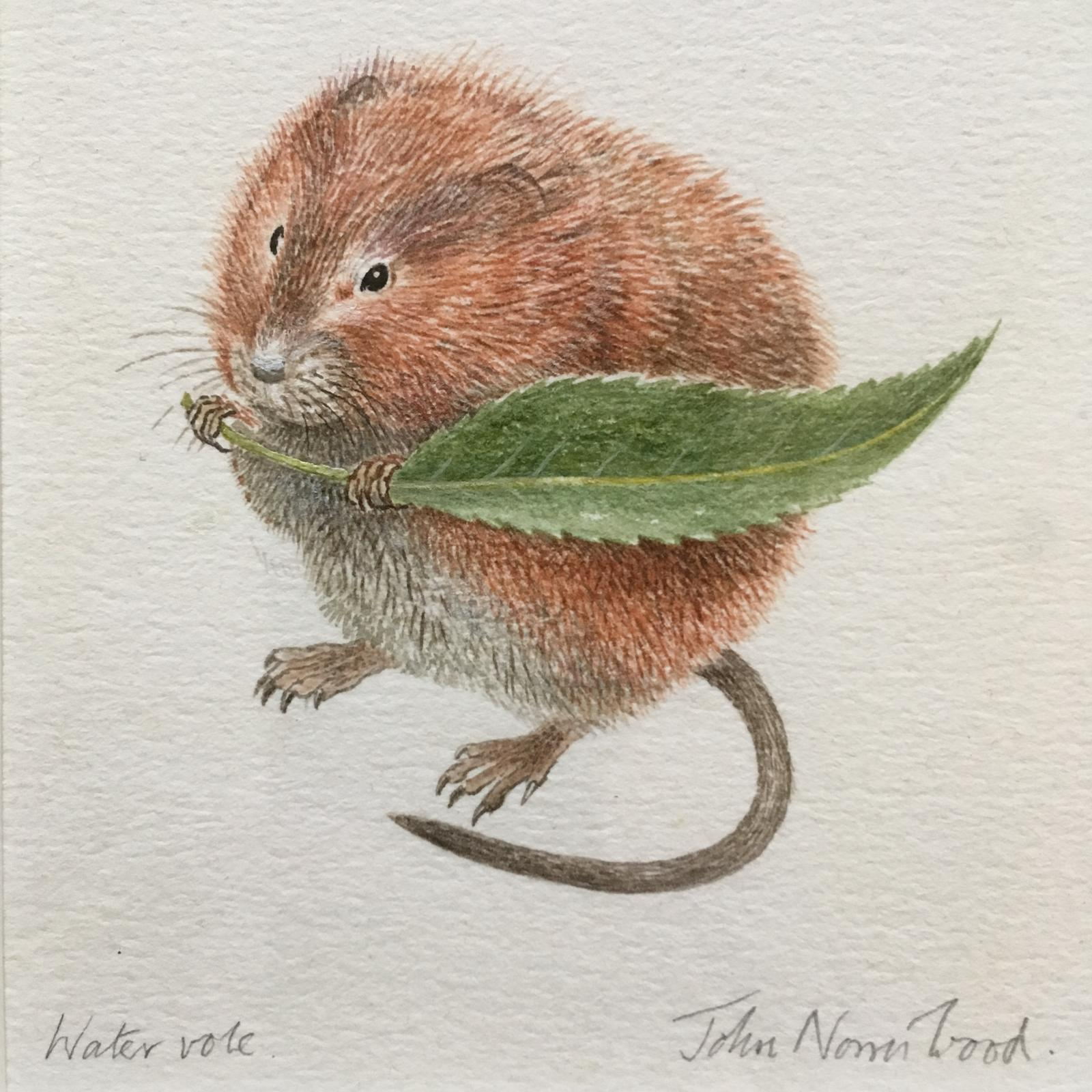
Water Vole

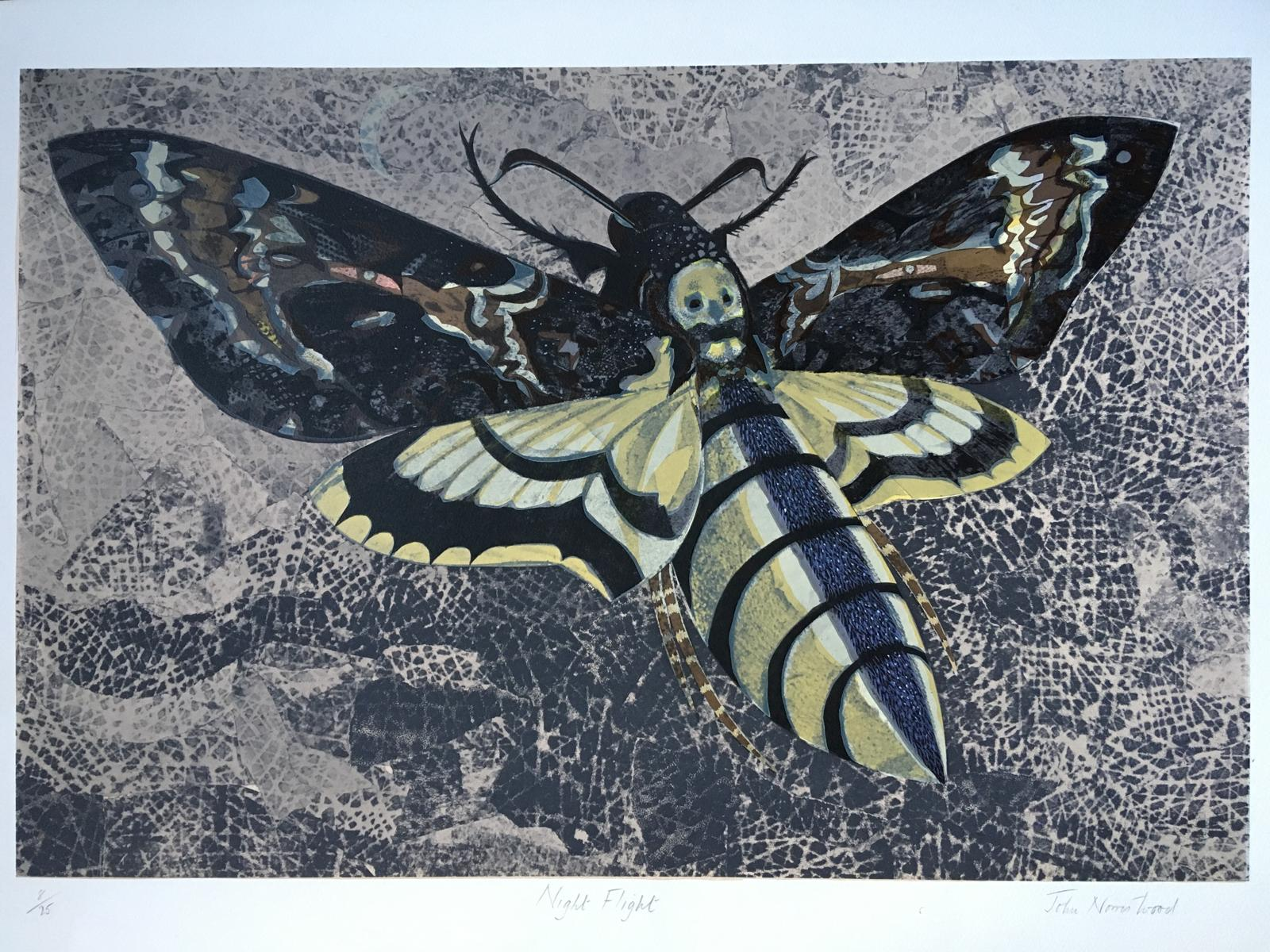
Night Flight

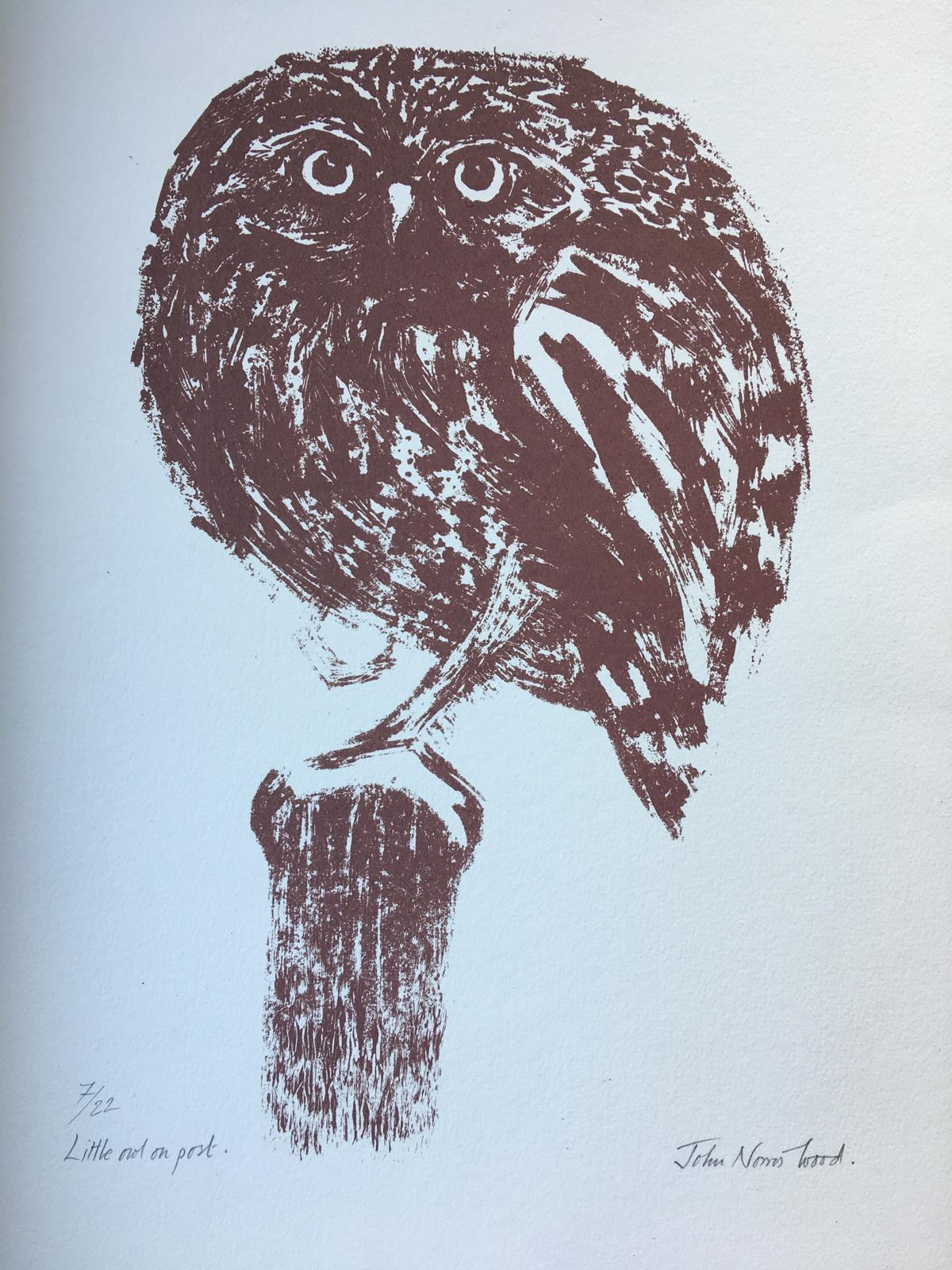
Owl

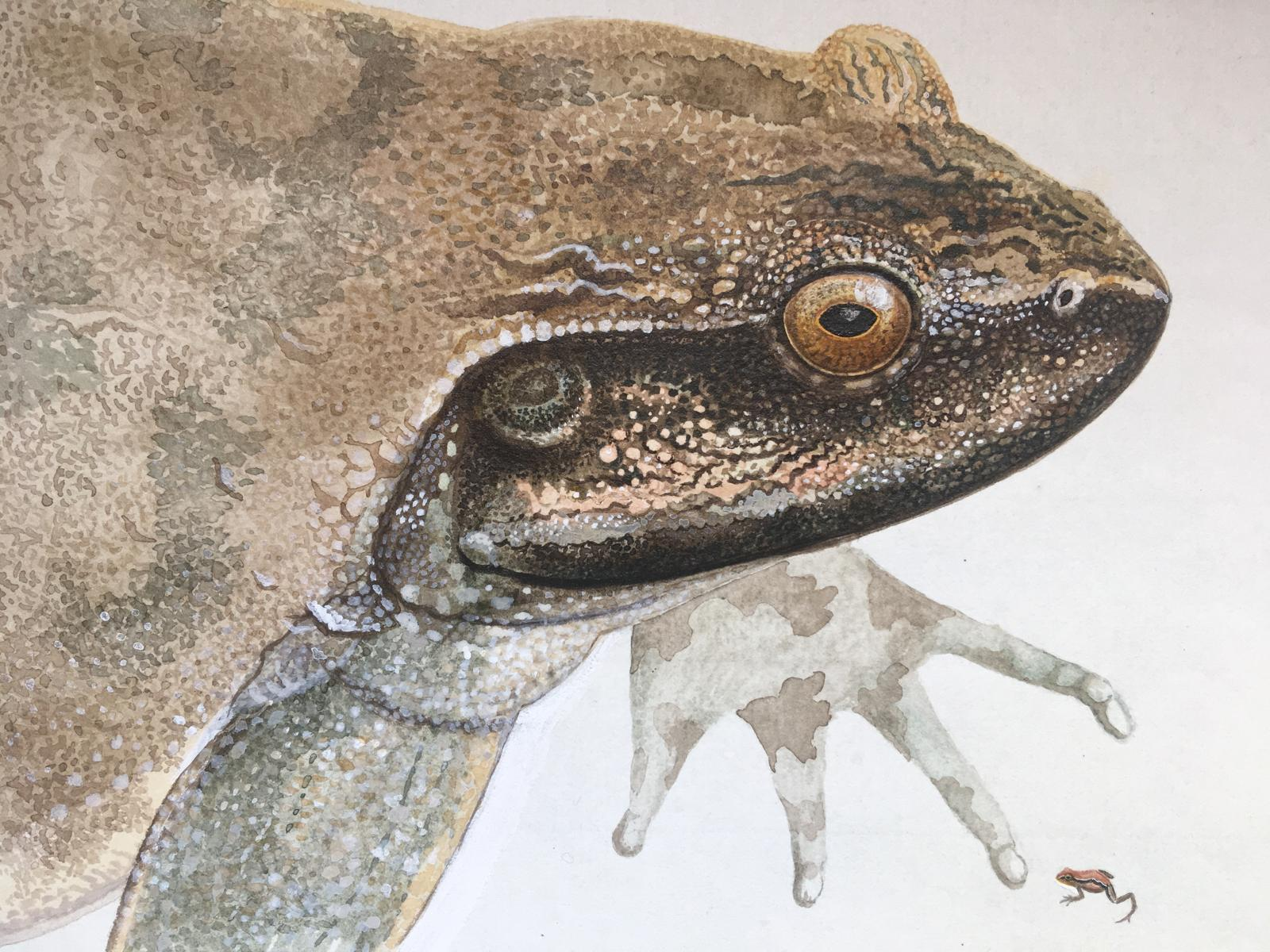
Frog detail

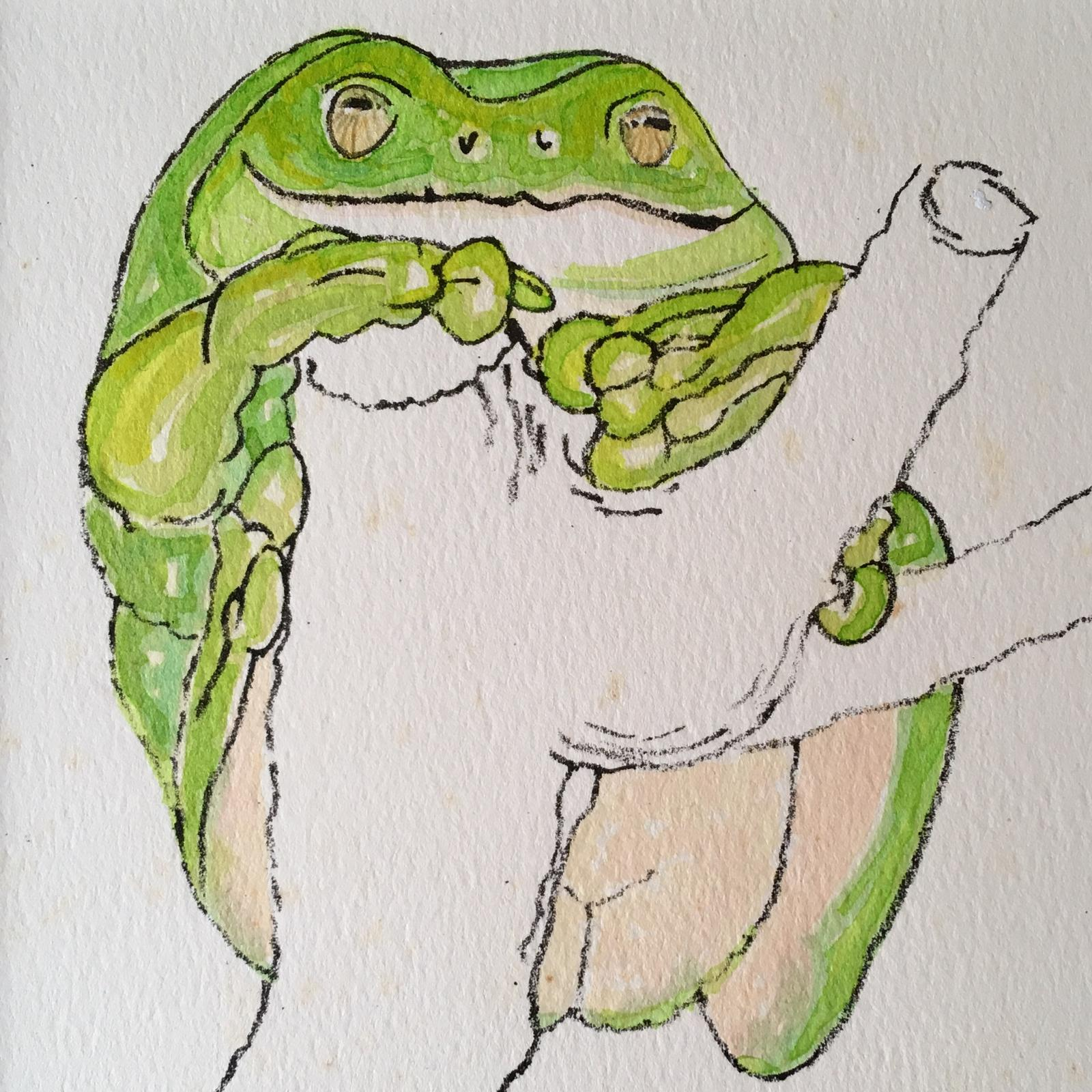
Frog

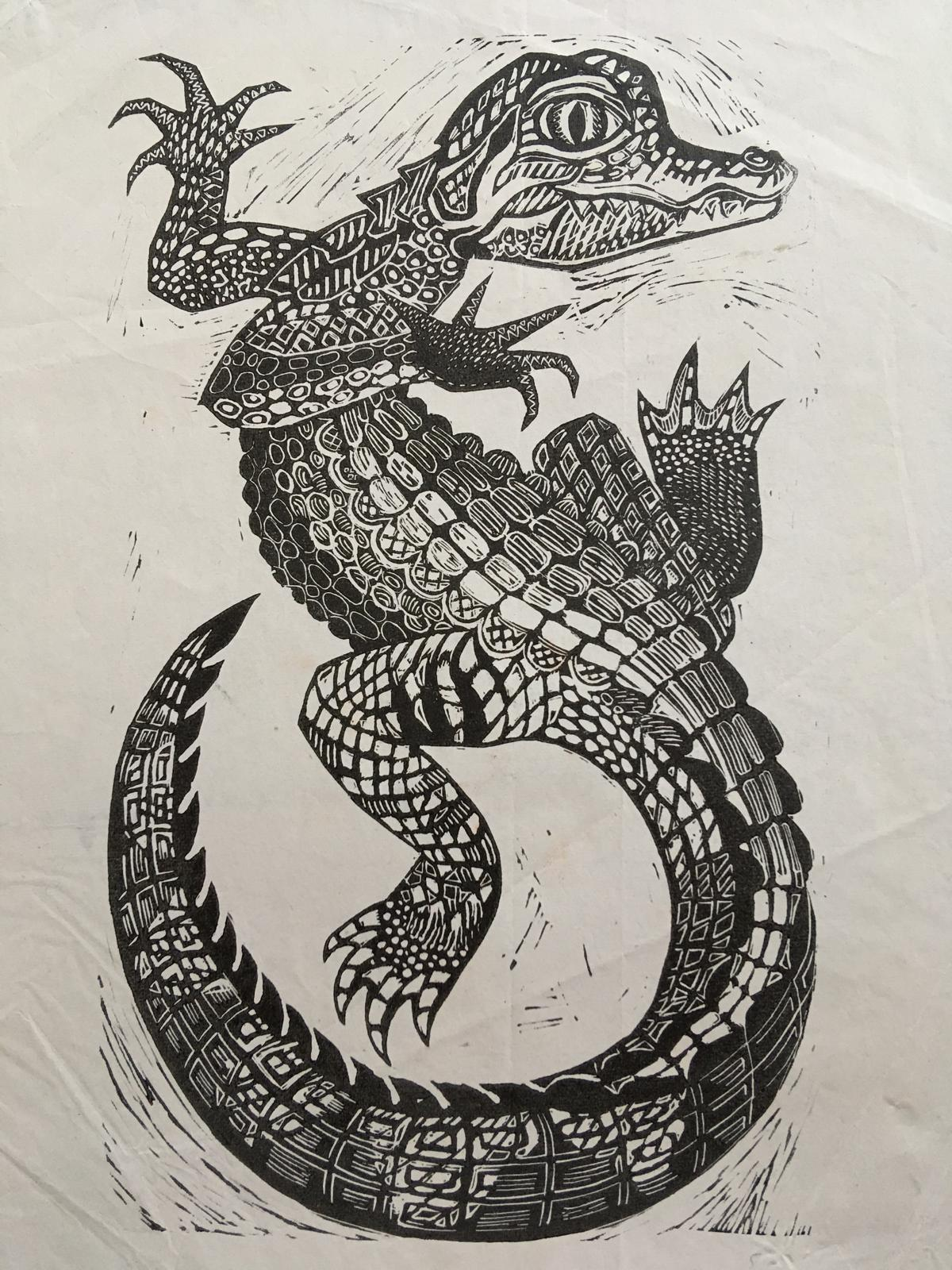

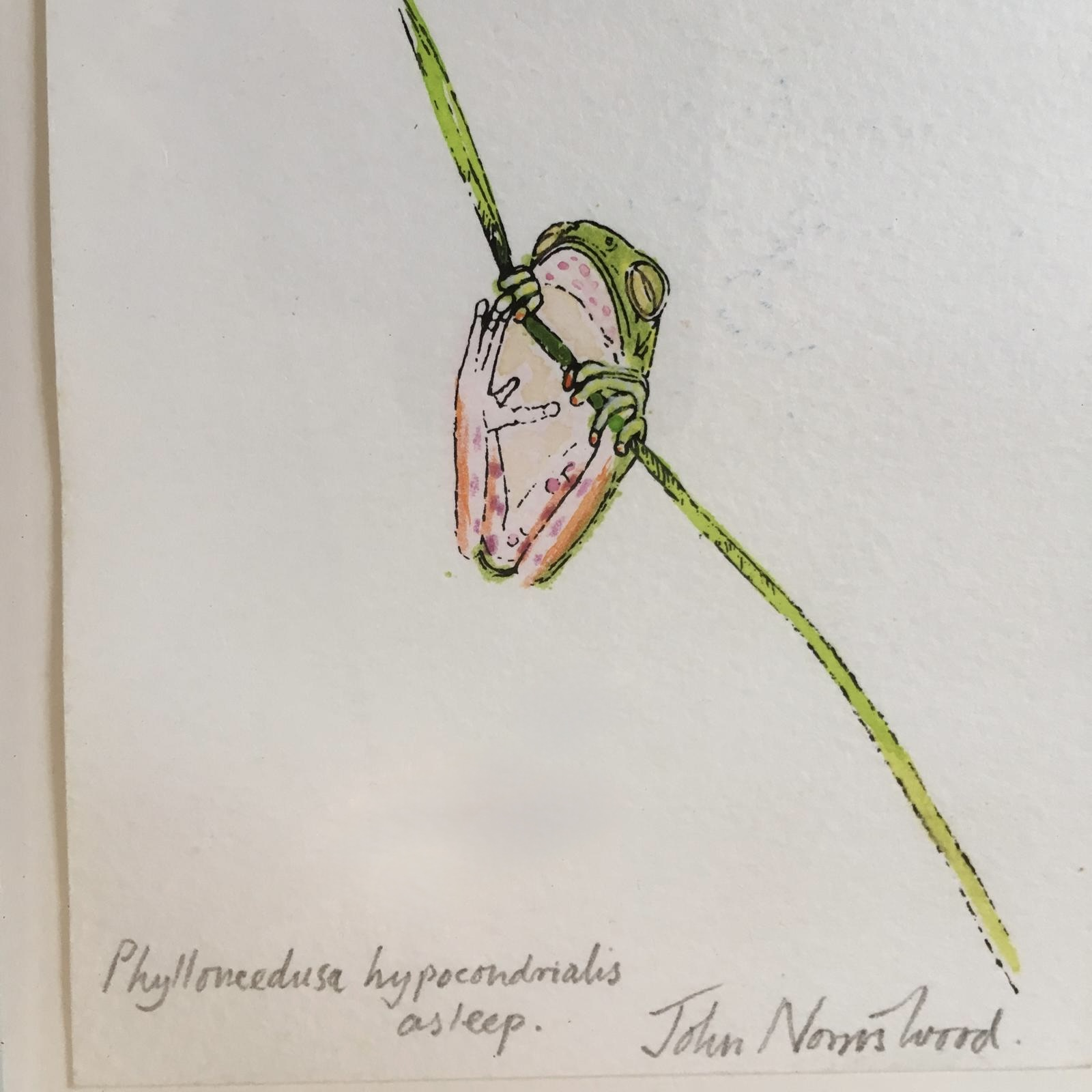
Phyllomedusa Hypochondrialis

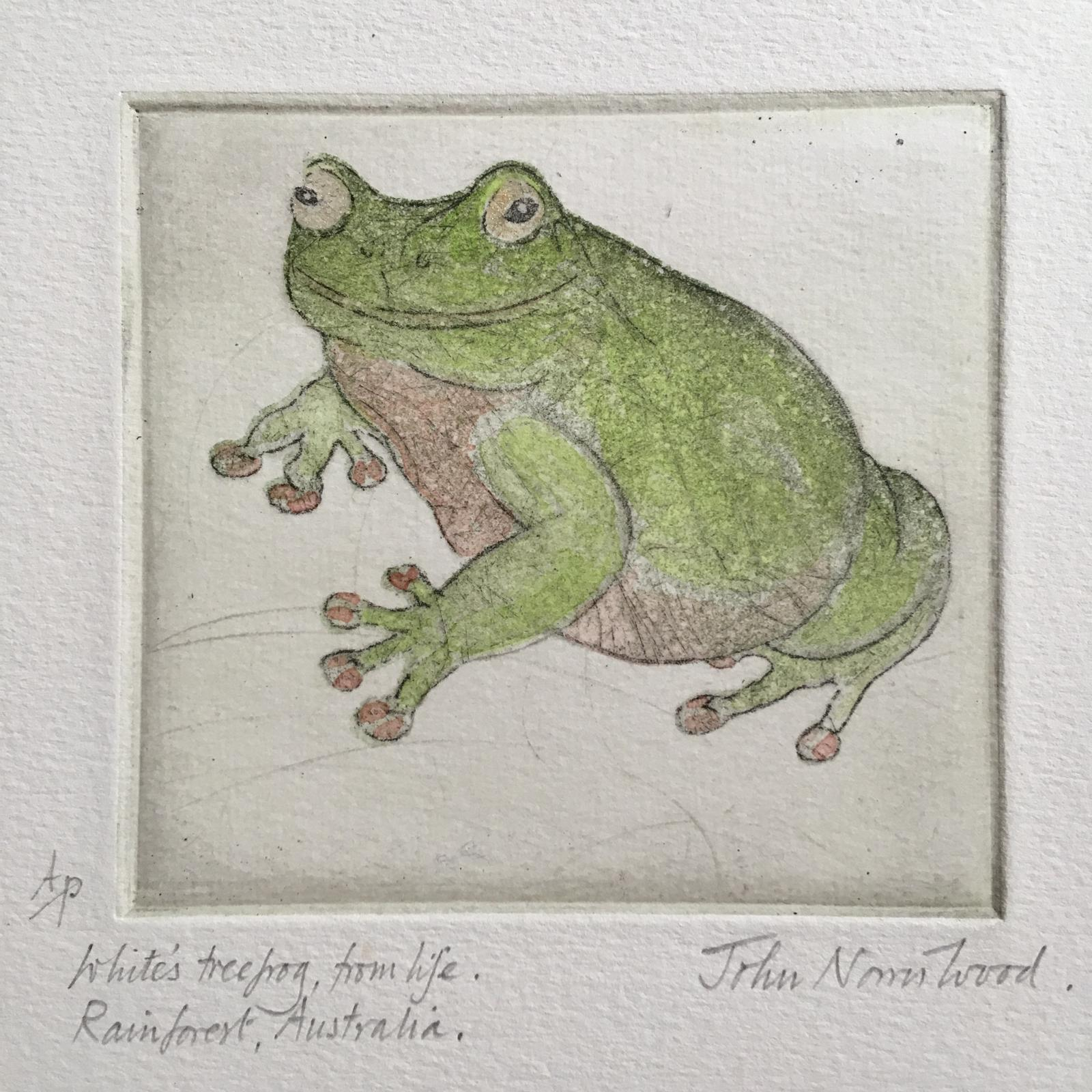
Whites Tree Frog

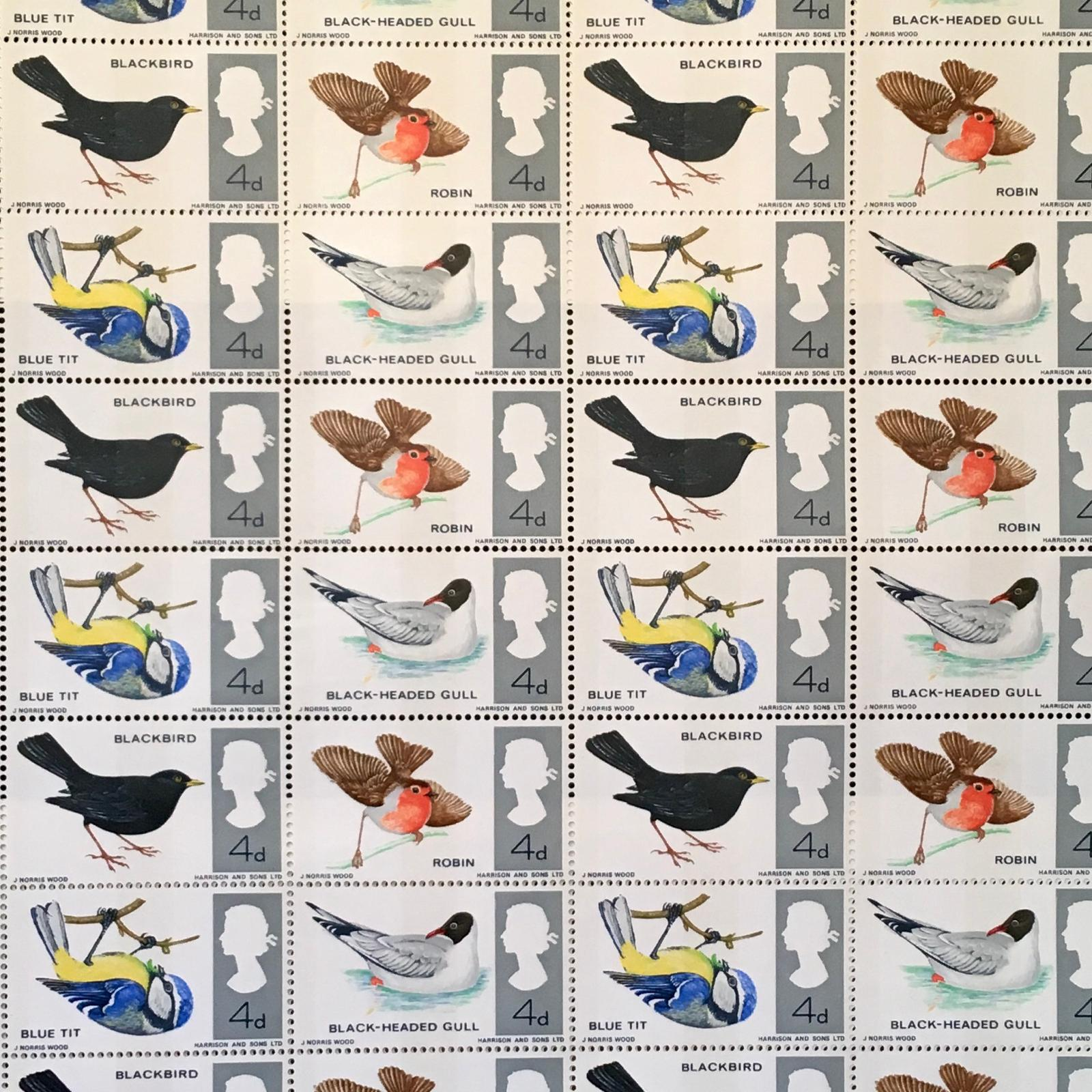
Postage Stamps

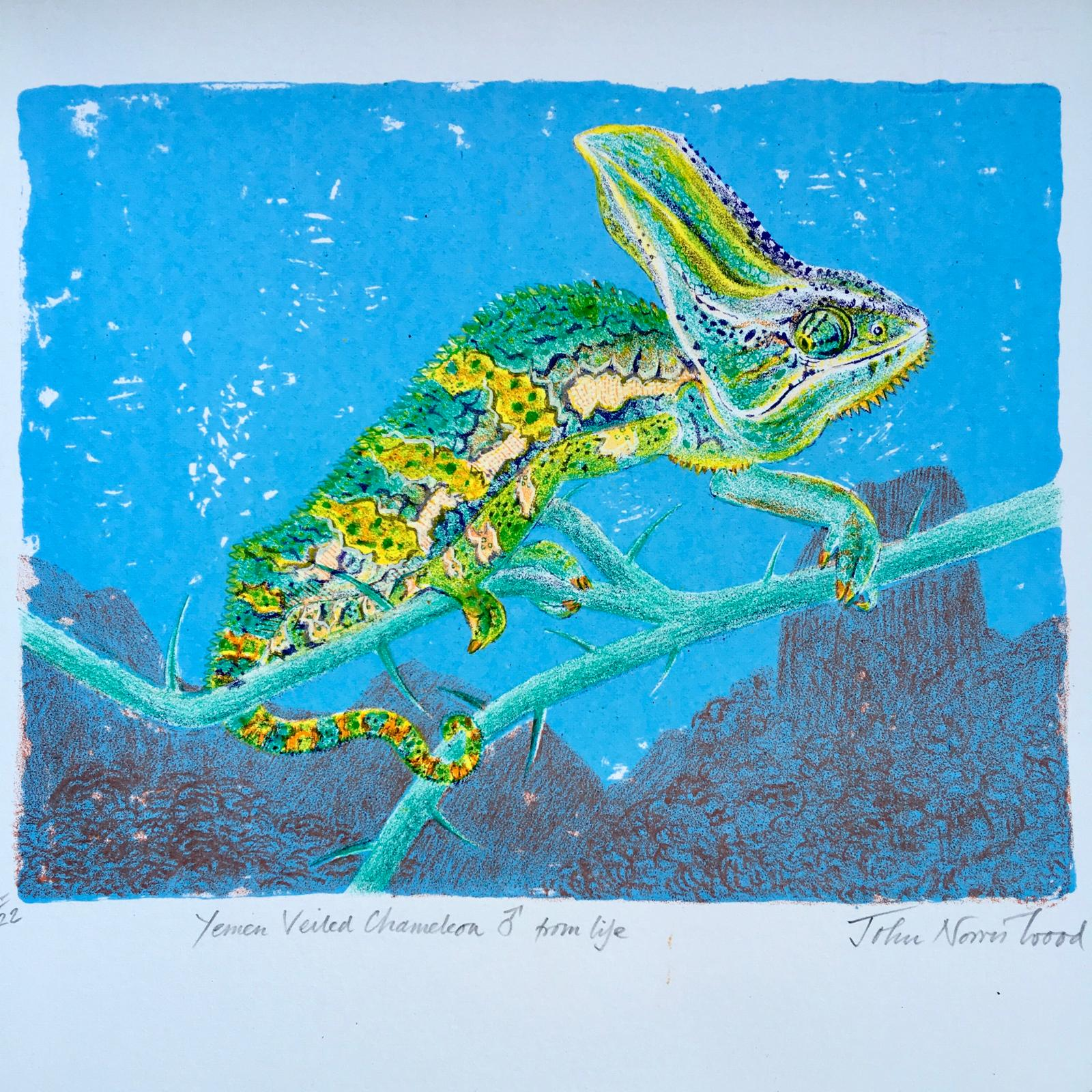
Yemen Veiled Chameleon

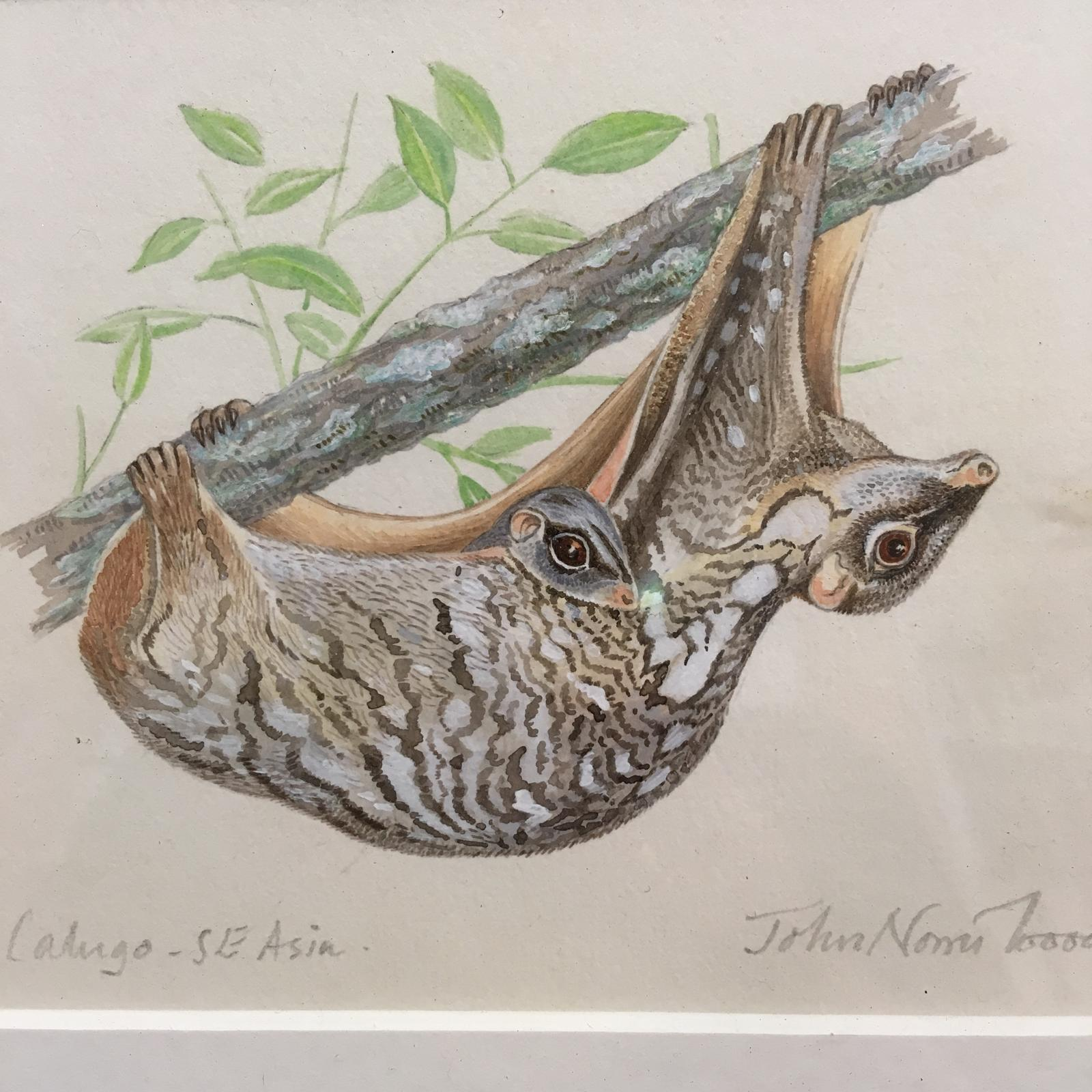
Colugo
