= Patience Gray =

English cookery & travel writer (1917-2005)

Patience Jean Gray (née Stanham; 31 October 1917 – 10 March 2005) was an English cookery and travel writer of the mid-20th century. Her two most popular books were Plats Du Jour (1957) – written with Primrose Boyd, about French cooking – and Honey From A Weed (1986), an account of the Mediterranean way of life.

== Upbringing ==
Born Patience Jean Stanham at Shackleford, near Godalming, Surrey, she was the second of three daughters of Hermann Stanham, a major in the Royal Field Artillery and his wife Olive Florence, née Colgate, daughter of a Lincolnshire farmer.

Patience discovered late in life that her father, at various times a surgeon, a pig farmer, and finally a photographer, was the son of a Polish rabbi called Warschavski, who had arrived in England in 1861 and become a Unitarian minister. During her childhood at Mitchen Hall, "a grand but rather isolated house of peach-coloured brick", her father's moods dominated family life: "I have listened to other people's accounts of their happy childhoods with sadness mingled with disbelief," Patience wrote. "I recognised mine as a snuffing out of every spontaneous impulse, to the point where one might have been said to be walking on tiptoe to avoid the detonations."

Her father's poor business sense (his pig farm failed) put strain on the family finances and her parents' marriage. Patience was sent to live with an aunt and uncle in London, where she and a cousin of hers attended Queen's College, a noted independent girls' school. She was an excellent student and passed her university entrance exams at the age of 16. However, her father thought she was too young to start university. She spent a year in Bonn, Germany, studying first economics, then switching to history of art, living in what she called a "kind of prison": a 17th-century observatory in the Poppelsdorfer Allee, with a professor of astronomy and his wife and child. A desire to escape the oppressive atmosphere of her lodgings led her out walking in the city, where she discovered a love of Baroque architecture." At the London School of Economics she studied under the future Labour leader Hugh Gaitskell.

== Early adulthood ==
In 1938, after graduating, Patience travelled with her sister Tania to Eastern Europe under a grant from the Quakers, who wanted to promote friendships with the Romanians. The sisters were there when Queen Marie, a grand-daughter of Queen Victoria, died in July. The lavishness of the funeral rites prompted Patience to write her first piece of journalism, which appeared in a Bucharest paper. Its editor became infatuated by Patience, filling her hotel room with bunches of tuberose, whose scent, she said, always filled her with remembered horror. Tania and Patience escaped his attentions by fleeing to the Black Sea in a monoplane piloted by a Romanian prince.

Patience returned to London in 1939 and took up a job at the Foreign Office. When the Second World War broke out, she was dismissed, she claimed, for "having too many foreign contacts". She went instead to the Arts Council, where she began an affair with Thomas Gray, although he was already married with two children. He was the brother of the industrial designer Milner Gray, founder of the London Design Institute. Patience and Thomas had two children, a son Nicholas and a daughter Miranda. She took his name by deed poll in the London Gazette of 17 January 1941. During the war, Patience moved to a cottage on the South Downs which had no electricity or running water. Thomas was conscripted.

Patience's career then followed a peripatetic course, through "temporary jobs for literary and artistic folk" that fitted in with single motherhood. She worked with the designer FHK Henrion, responsible for the displays inside the Country Pavilion at the 1951 Festival of Britain. There she met Primrose Boyd, with whom she later set up a freelance research partnership.

Gray's first book was as an editor and was not food-related: Indoor Plants and Gardens, published in 1952, is a practical guide to growing, maintaining and using them as decoration in the modernistic interiors of 1950s homes. In the mid-1950s, she was one of a group of translators who worked on a new edition of Larousse Gastronomique.

Her first bestseller was Plats du Jour, or Foreign Food, a collaboration written with her business partner Boyd and illustrated by David Gentleman, then at the beginning of his illustrious career. It sold 50,000 copies in its first year, initially far outstripping Elizabeth David's books, and was reprinted by Persephone Books in 2006.

In 1958 Patience Gray beat over a thousand applicants to become the first editor of The Observer women's page. With little agreement over what should be on it, Patience had free rein. Women, she felt, did not want to acquire, but to learn. She supplied them with articles on European art, design, thought and habits up to 1961, when a new superior, George Seddon, decided women were interested in more down-to-earth subjects such as shopping and cooking.

== Later life and legacy ==
In the early 1960s her life changed again when she fell in love with the Belgian artist and sculptor Norman Mommens, who was married at the time to potter Ursula Mommens. Gray and Norman Mommens embarked on a journey round the Mediterranean following a vein of stone from Provence, Carrara, Catalonia, the Greek island of Naxos, and finally southern Italy, where in 1970 they settled in a farmhouse in Apulia. She refused to have such modern conveniences as a refrigerator, telephone or electric light. She wrote of this life in Honey From a Weed, a book about rural life, folklore and cookery, full of recipes featuring peasant food. In 1994, she eventually married Mommens, who died in 2000.

The person who saw Honey From a Weed into print was Alan Davidson of Prospect Books, an admirer who became a friend. Many foodies (a term coined by her friend Paul Levy, who wrote her entry in the ODNB) visited her Italian home, including Derek Cooper, who interviewed her for BBC Radio Four's The Food Programme The book has been championed by writers and chefs from Jeremy Lee to Clarissa Dickson Wright.

Patience Gray's other books include Ring Doves And Snakes (1989), a darker account of the couple's year on Naxos and why they were forced to leave; The Centaur's Kitchen (1964, published only posthumously in 2005 by Tom Jaine of Prospect Books), a set of recipes for the Chinese cooks of the Blue Funnel Shipping Line aboard the newly launched cargo liner, the Centaur, plying from western Australia to Singapore; and Work Adventures, Childhood Dreams (self-published, 1999), a collection of autobiographical essays.

Patience Gray was one of ten "career women" featured in Rachel Cooke's look at the 1950s.

A full-length biography appeared in 2017, Fasting and Feasting: The Life of Visionary Food Writer Patience Gray by Adam Federman. "There's something strictly otherworldly about the recipes in Honey From a Weed, despite their simple ingredients and clear directions," wrote Laura Shapiro in The New York Times. "Each dish is inextricable from its time and place, those villages and landscapes and rustic kitchens that inspired both the cooking and the writing. How dare we bring home a cauliflower from the supermarket, turn on the air-conditioner and the nightly news, and start preparing cavolfiore colla salsa virgiliana (cauliflower with Virgil's sauce)? Gray wasn't inflexible, as we know from the tinned peaches, but she had no wish to identify with late 20th-century cooks. Her loyalty was to plants and fish and the seasons, and to villagers who taught her how to make use of everything surrounding her."

== Books ==
Sources:

- Plats Du Jour, 1957 ISBN 1-903155-60-6, Reprinted by Persephone Books 2006
- Honey From A Weed, 1986 ISBN 1-903018-20-X
- Work Adventures Childhood Dreams, 1999 ISBN 88-87809-01-1
- Ring Doves and Snakes, 1989 ISBN 0-333-48612-9
- The Centaur's Kitchen: A Book of French, Italian, Greek & Catalan Dishes for Ships' Cooks on the Blue Funnel Line, 2006 ISBN 978-1903018-73-6
- Margaret E. Jones (1952), ed. Patience Gray: Indoor Plants and Gardens, Great Britain, Architectural Press, 1952
