= Mary Fedden =

British artist (1915–2012)

Mary Fedden OBE RA PPRWA
- Born: 14 August 1915; Bristol, England
- Died: 22 June 2012 (aged 96)
- Education: Slade School of Fine Arts (1932-36)
- Movement: Modernism
- Spouse: Julian Trevelyan (m. 1951; died 1988)
- Elected: President of the RWA (1984-1988); Royal Academician (27 May 1992)

Mary Fedden, OBE RA PPRWA (14 August 1915 – 22 June 2012) was a British artist.

== Early years ==
Sometimes mistakenly described as the daughter of Roy Fedden (who was in fact her uncle, as was Romilly Fedden), Mary Fedden was born in Bristol where she attended the city's Badminton School. At the age of 16, she studied at the Slade School of Fine Arts, London from 1932 to 1936. Of her time at the Slade, she recalled, 'after Badminton, the Slade was like stepping from hell into heaven.' At the Slade, Fedden was a pupil of the theatre designer, Vladimir Polunin.

When she finished her studies, she taught, painted portraits and created stage designs for Sadler's Wells Theatre. She then returned to Bristol where she painted and taught until World War II broke out. During the Second World War, Fedden served in the Women's Land Army and the Woman's Voluntary Service and as a driver for the NAAFI in Europe. She was also commissioned to create murals for the war effort.

== Style and influences ==
After the war was over, Fedden developed her own style of flower paintings and still lifes, reminiscent of artists such as Matisse and Braque.

In 1995, she acknowledged in an interview in The Artist magazine:

I really float from influence to influence…. I found the early Ben Nicholsons fascinating as were the paintings of his wife Winifred. I also admire the Scottish artist Anne Redpath and the French painter Henri Hayden.

Fedden's subjects are often executed in a bold, expressive style with vivid, contrasting colours, although her work of 2005–6 uses a narrower tonal range. Her still lifes are often placed in front of a landscape, as she enjoyed the contrasting of disparate, even quirky elements. When using watercolours she emphasised the rough texture of her favourite Indian papers.

== Exhibitions ==
Fedden exhibited in one-person shows throughout the UK every year from 1947 until her death in 2012. These included the Mansard Gallery in Heal's Department Store in 1947, Redfern Gallery, London from 1953, the New Grafton Gallery, London from the 1960s, the Hamet Gallery from 1970, the Arnolfini Gallery, Bristol, Bohun Gallery, Henley on Thames from 1984 and at the Beaux Arts Gallery, London in the 1990s. A major exhibition of her work was held at the Royal West of England Academy in 1996.

=== Major exhibitions ===
- 1967 – Mansard Gallery, Heal's, London
- 1988, 1996 – Royal West of England Academy
- 2008, 2014, 2015, 2017 – Portland Gallery, London
- 2016 – Jerwood Gallery, Hastings

== Commissions and societies ==
Fedden also received several commissions for murals, notably the Festival of Britain in 1951, the P&O liner Canberra in 1961, Charing Cross Hospital in 1980 (along with her husband, Julian Trevelyan), Colindale Hospital in 1985, and for schools in Bristol, Hertfordshire and London.

In 1956, Fedden became a member of the London Group and became the chairperson of the Women's International Art Club, a post she held for three years.

== Collections ==
Her work can be found in numerous public and private collections such as the Chantrey Bequest for the Tate Gallery, HM the Queen's Collection, HM the Queen for Windsor Castle, the Pallant House Gallery, Peterborough Museum, the Royal Academy in London, Contemporary Art Society, Falmouth Art Gallery, Durham University, the University of Bath, Jerwood Collection, UK Government Art Collection, the City Art Galleries of Carlisle, Hereford, Hull, Bristol, Edinburgh and Sheffield.

== Teaching ==
Fedden taught painting at the Royal College of Art from 1958 to 1964, and was the first woman tutor in the Painting School. Her pupils included David Hockney and Allen Jones. She subsequently taught at the Yehudi Menuhin School in Cobham, Surrey, from 1965 to 1970.

== Personal life ==
In 1951, Mary Fedden married the artist Julian Trevelyan.

== Later career ==
In 1995, the writer and critic Mel Gooding wrote a monograph on Fedden's work tracing her long career up to her marriage to Julian Trevelyan and their life together on the Thames at Chiswick, London. In 2007, a second book on Fedden written by Christopher Andreae was published, tracing her whole career up to 2006.

From 1984, Fedden held the post of President of the Royal West of England Academy (RWA), up until 1988, the same year her husband Julian Trevelyan died. She was an academician of the Royal Academy and received an honorary doctorate from the University of Bath. She also received an OBE and an honorary degree from the University of Durham (2009) for her work.

For many years, Fedden was a close friend of the former television presenter Anna Ford. Fedden remained a prolific and popular painter until her death in 2012. She continued to live and work in the studio she shared with her husband from the 1940s on the River Thames, London. She died, aged 96, in London.
