= Norman Mommens =

Belgian sculptor

Norman Mommens (31 May 1922 – 8 February 2000) was a Belgian sculptor.

Born in Antwerp, his father was Flemish and his mother was English. He studied mural painting at Elkerlyc, the High School for Architecture and the Visual Arts, in Amsterdam. World War II and two years of forced labor during the German occupation of Belgium prevented him from continuing his studies. In 1948, he left Belgium for England.

Mommens was married to the English potter Ursula Trevelyan (née Darwin), but divorced her. In 1963, he met the English author Patience Gray (née Stanham), they moved to Greece and then Italy in 1970. They did not legally wed until 1994. Mommens and Gray both died in Presicce, Italy.
