= St Mary's Church, Downe =

Church in Downe, London, England

Coordinates: 51.3359°N 0.0544°E

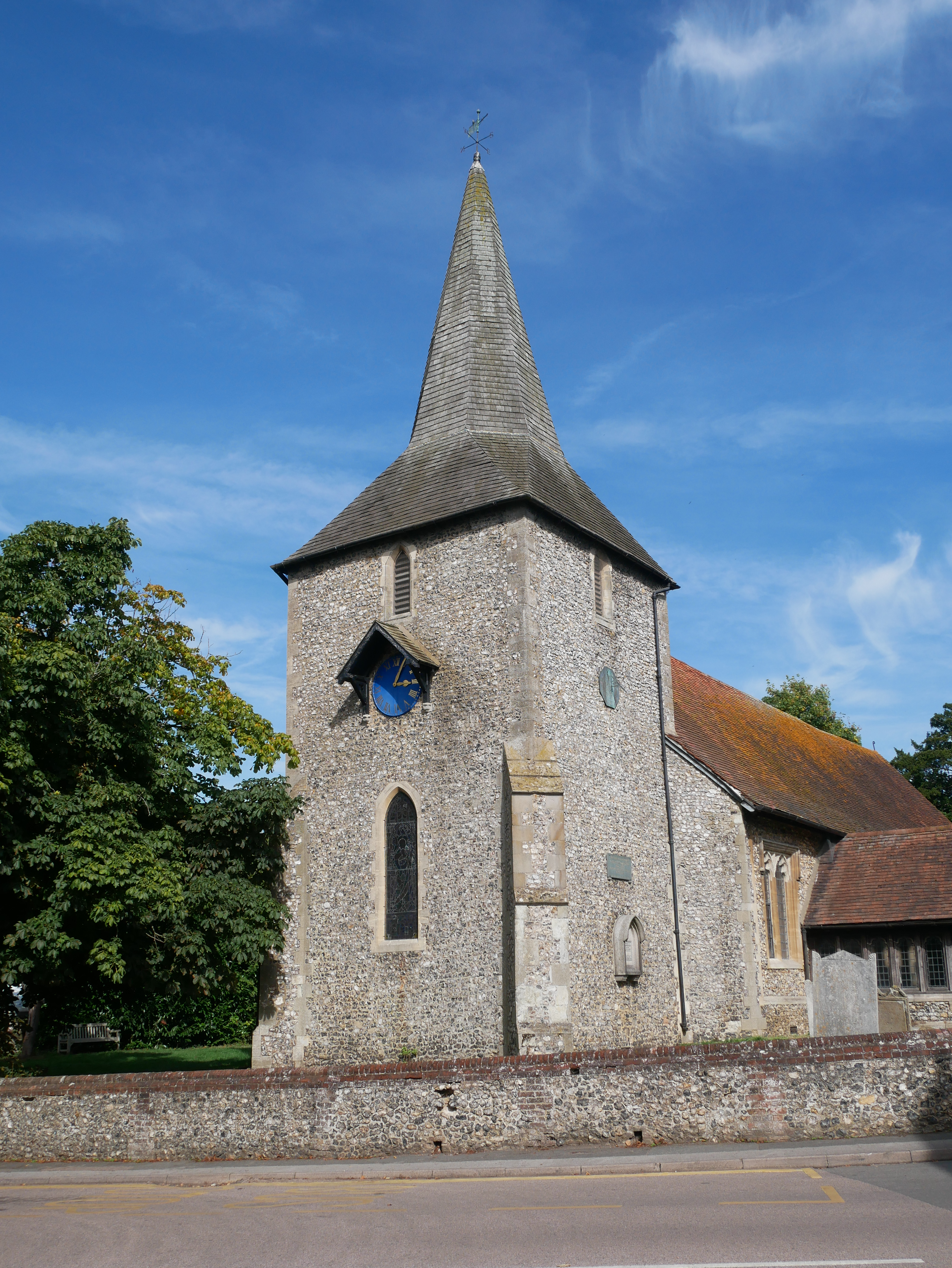
Southwest view of the church

St Mary's Church in the village of Downe, Bromley (formerly Kent) is the Church of England Parish Church for the parish of Downe. It is a Grade II* listed building, which dates from the 13th century. The church is dedicated to either St Mary the Virgin or St Mary Magdalene. The west window is the oldest stained glass, depicting Christ as the Good Shepherd, by Daniel Bell (1840-1915).

== Darwin family ==
The Church, as with the village of Downe itself, is closely linked with the naturalist Charles Darwin who lived at nearby Down House from 1842 to his death in 1882. John Brodie Innes was the vicar from 1846. Darwin played a leading part in the parish work of the church, but from around 1849 would go for a walk on Sundays while his family attended church. Charles's wife, Emma Darwin, was Unitarian and the family would face away when the Anglican Trinitarian Creed was read.

Several members of the Darwin family are buried in the churchyard, Charles's brother Erasmus Alvey Darwin (died 1881), Emma Darwin (1896), Charles and Emma's children Mary Eleanor Darwin (1842), Charlie (1858), Elizabeth (1926), Henrietta (1927); Elinor Monsell (1954) and her husband, Charles and Emma's grandson Bernard Darwin (1961). Charles Darwin had wished to be buried here too but was instead buried in Westminster Abbey.

Emma Darwin's sister Elizabeth Wedgwood and Charles and Emma's Aunt Sarah Wedgwood are also buried together in the St Mary the Virgin churchyard.

== Present day ==
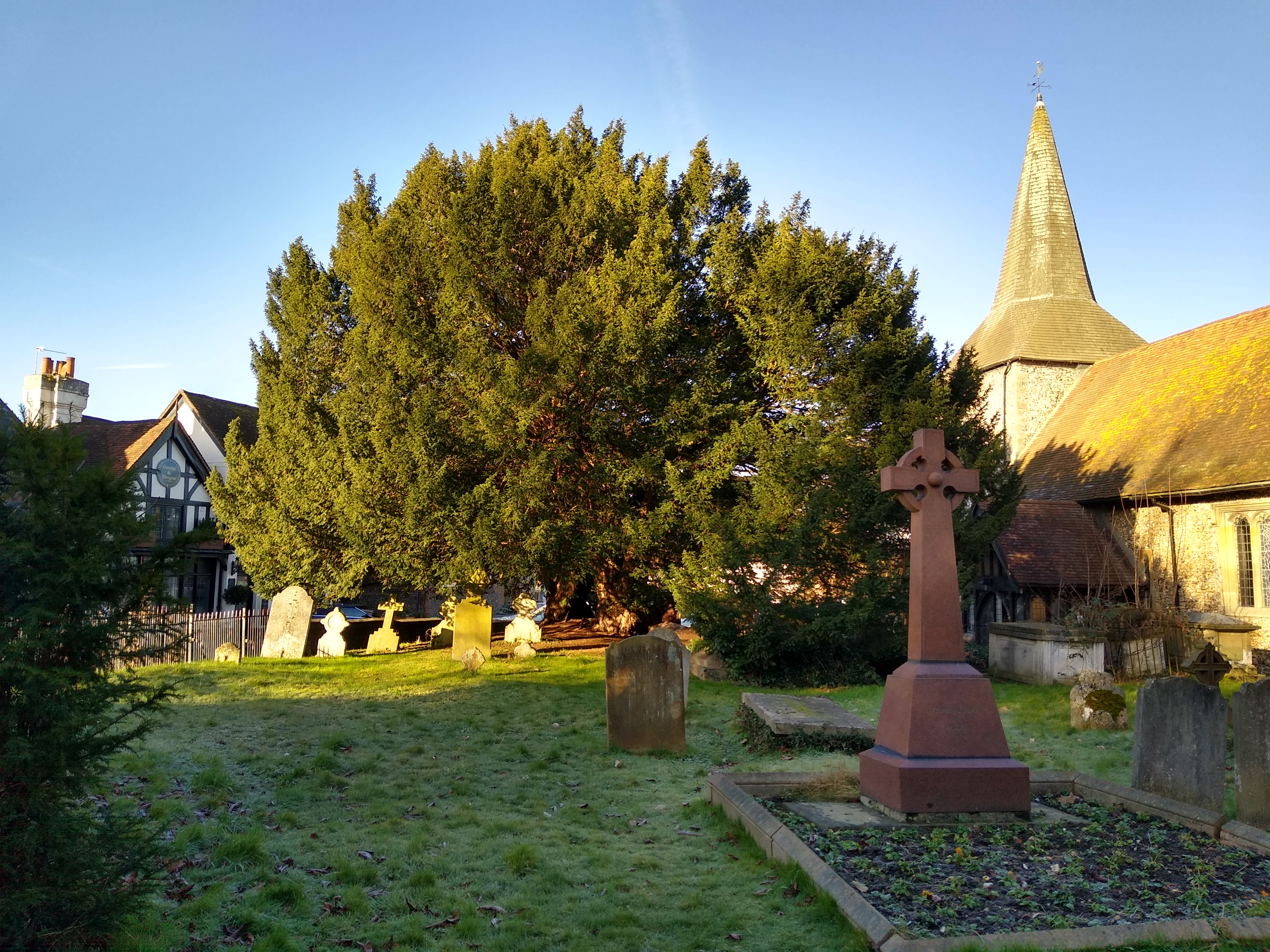
The yew tree in the churchyard is one of the Great Trees of London.

St Mary's stands in the Conservative Evangelical tradition of the Church of England. Its graveyard is home to a yew tree that is one of the Great Trees of London.
