= Golf Club Managers' Association =

- Established: 1933
- Type: Professional association
- Headquarters: Bristol and Clifton Golf Club, Bristol, England
- Region served: United Kingdom
- Services: Professional Development, Education
- Members: 2,000

The Golf Club Managers' Association, or GCMA (formerly the Association of Golf Club Secretaries) is a UK professional association for secretaries, managers, or owners of golf courses. The organisation was headquartered in Weston-super-Mare, Somerset, from 1999 until 2014, when it moved to Bristol and Clifton Golf Club.

The association was formed in 1933. Its core activities include networking and professional development. The association participates in joint educational ventures with other organizations, including an online training course in association with Buckinghamshire New University and a joint Safety Management System in association with the British and International Golf Greenkeepers Association, or BIGGA. The Safety Management System is designed to standardize health and safety programmes throughout the member golf courses of both organizations.

== Magazine ==
The association produces a magazine and website published by Union Press for the benefit of its membership. Originally called Course and Club House, the magazine - after Golf Monthly and PGA Magazine, the world's third oldest golf magazine still in circulation - began quarterly publication in 1935. The first issue contained an article by then-AGCS President Bernard Darwin, grandson of naturalist Charles Darwin. In 1967, the magazine's name was changed to Golf Management, which later became Golf Club Management in 1975. The magazine moved from a quarterly format to the current monthly publication schedule in January 1988. Golf Club Management supplements coverage of the industry with regular articles from experts in the field.
