= Wilfrid Wood (artist) =

British artist (born 1968)

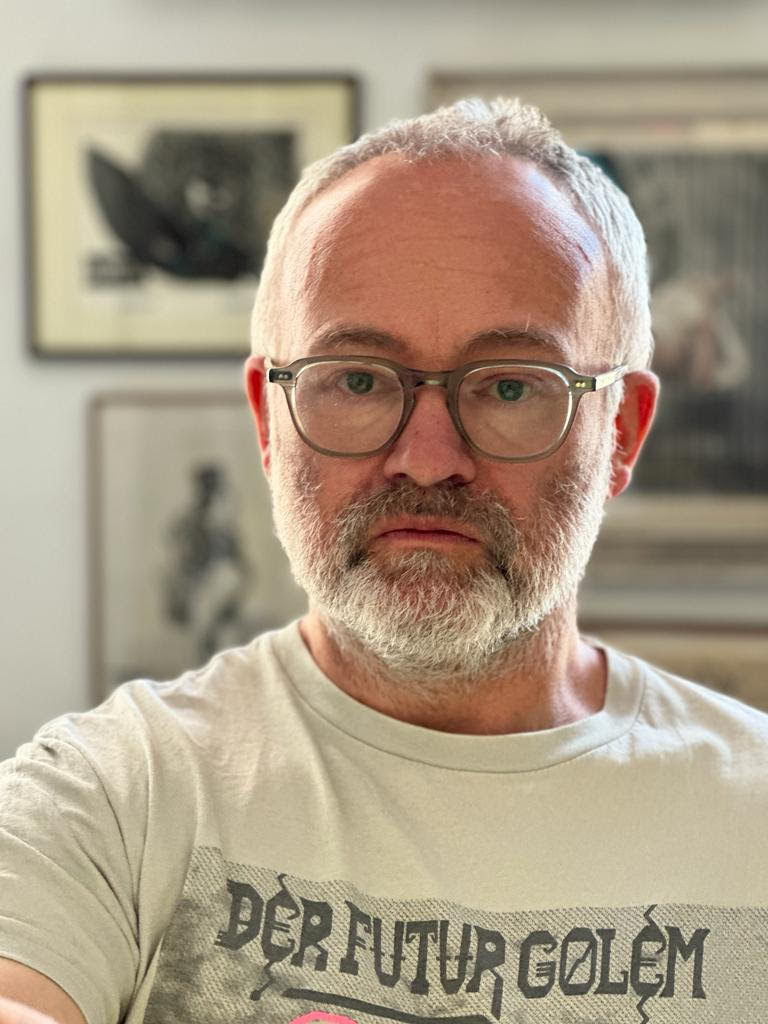
- Wood in 2023
- Born: 1968 (age 57–58); London, England
- Education: Central Saint Martins
- Style: Sculptor, illustrator

Wilfrid Wood (born 1968) is an English artist working in various mediums and specialising in portraiture. He trained in graphics at Central St Martins before building latex heads for satirical TV programme, Spitting Image.

== Early life and education ==
Wood was born in London, the son of illustrator John Norris Wood. He was raised in rural Sussex surrounded by a family of artists. He graduated from Central St Martins with a degree in graphic design.

== Career ==
Wood began his career in publishing, designing layouts for encyclopaedias. Bored by the work, he applied for a job as a “head builder” on the satirical TV programme Spitting Image, making eyeball mechanisms for the puppets of public figures.

Using many mediums including polymer clay and plasticine, Wood’s candid portraits depict everyday themes from politicians to sportsmen, from musicians to celebrities with the occasional dog walker for good measure. His work has been featured in different magazines, shows and exhibitions. In 2021, he designed BEEF! is a simple card game for two or more players published by Rough Trade Books.

Wood works out of his studio in Hackney Wick and holds various sculpting workshops.

== Exhibitions ==
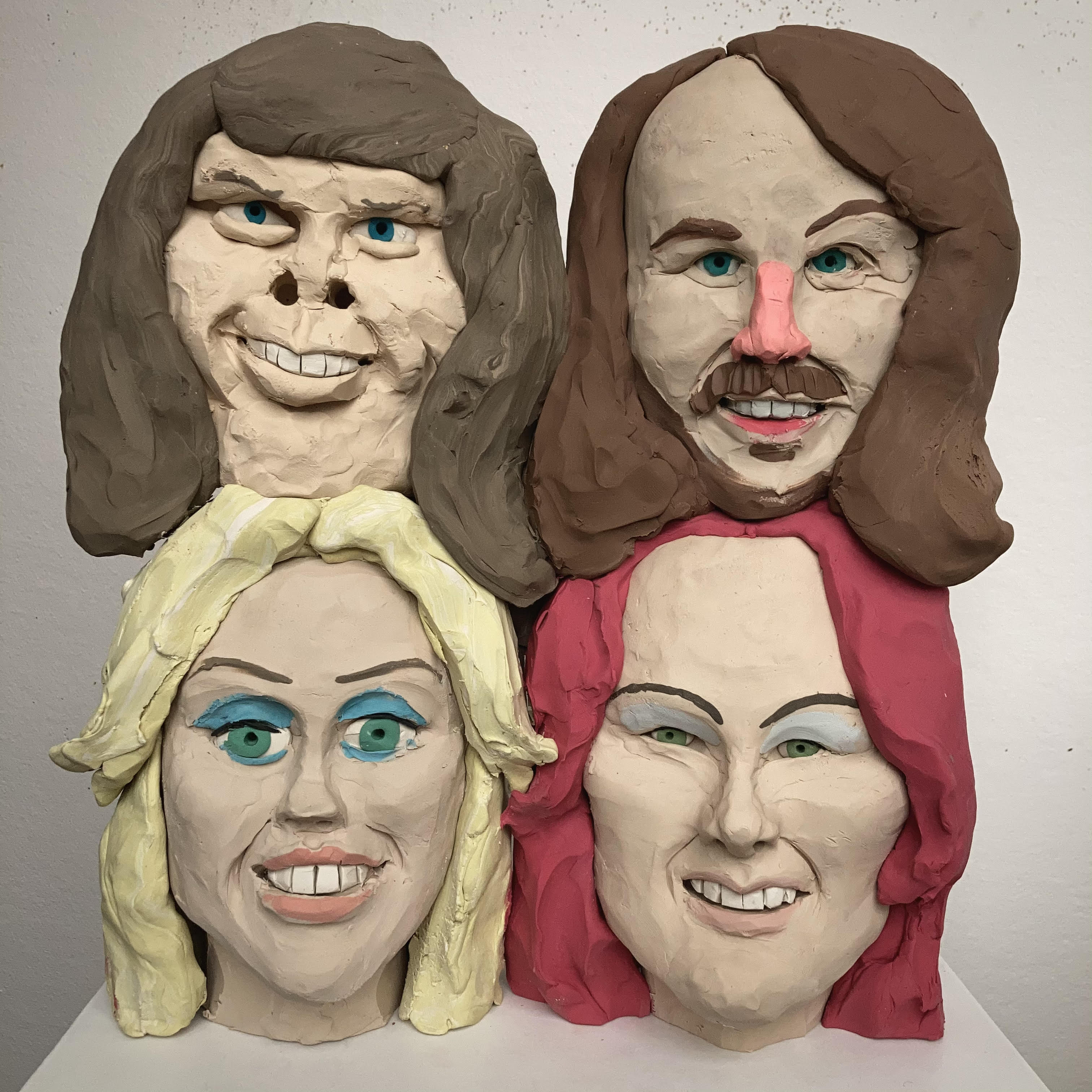

- Country Life, solo exhibition at Frmd, London, 2023
- Group exhibition at the Royal Watercolour Society, 2023
- Hampstead Art Society, group show, London, 2023
- Green & Stone, group show, London, 2023
- Diving Deep, group exhibition at the University of Kent, 2023
- Funny Ha Ha! Group exhibition at Maddox Gallery, London, 2022
- These Cartoons are a Work Event, group show Cartoon Museum, London, 2022
- Virile, group show, House of St Barnabas, London 2022
- People, solo exhibition, Copeland Gallery, London, 2021
- Royal Academy Summer show, London, 2021
- Rude Assembly, group show, Australia, 2021
- Drawings of my BF, solo show, Studio 59, London, 2019
- Group Show, Alan Kluckow Fine Art, Ascot, 2018
- Drawing People, solo exhibition at Space Gallery, Hackney, 2018
- Pink, group show, Colette, Paris, 2018
- Royal Academy Summer show, London, 2018
- Solo show, Volume Gallery, Berlin, 2016
- Olympic Portraits, solo exhibition, 2016
- Pop Living, group show, Schwartz Gallery, 2015
- Futagotamagawa biennale, Japan, 2015
- Dog Show, solo show, Beach Gallery, London, 2014
- KK Outlet, solo show, London, 2013
- Chisenhale Gallery, group show, London, 2012
- Object Abuse, group show, KK Outlet, London 2011
- Somerset House, group show, London, 2011
- La Scatola, group show, London, 2011
- Solo Show, Sang Sang Madang, South Korea, 2010
- Lulubell Toy Bodega, group show, Tucson, Arizona, 2008
- SEA 2 The Wig Has Gone Out, group show, London, 2006
- Being Hunted, group show, Berlin, 2006
- SEA 1, Normal, group show, London, 2004
