= Ursula Mommens =

English potter

- Ursula Mommens at work, c. 1950
- Born: Ursula Frances Elinor Darwin; 20 August 1908; Cambridge, England
- Died: 30 January 2010 (aged 101)
- Education: Royal College of Art
- Known for: Pottery
- Spouse(s): Julian Trevelyan; Norman Mommens

Ursula Frances Elinor Mommens (née Darwin, formerly Trevelyan; 20 August 1908 – 30 January 2010) was an English potter. Mommens studied at the Royal College of Art, under William Staite Murray, and later worked with Michael Cardew at Winchcombe Pottery and Wenford Bridge Pottery.

Born in Cambridge and raised in Downe (then in Kent, now in Bromley), she was the daughter of Bernard Darwin and his wife the engraver Elinor Monsell. Her brother was Sir Robert Vere Darwin. She was the great-granddaughter of Charles Darwin and the great-great-granddaughter of the potter Josiah Wedgwood.

She married first Julian Trevelyan; their son is the film-maker Philip Trevelyan. Her second husband was Norman Mommens.

Mommens lived and worked in South Heighton, East Sussex, making both wood and gas-fired functional stoneware using a clay body she developed herself with ash glazes. She lived to the age of 101.
