= Robin Darwin =

British painter (1910–1974)

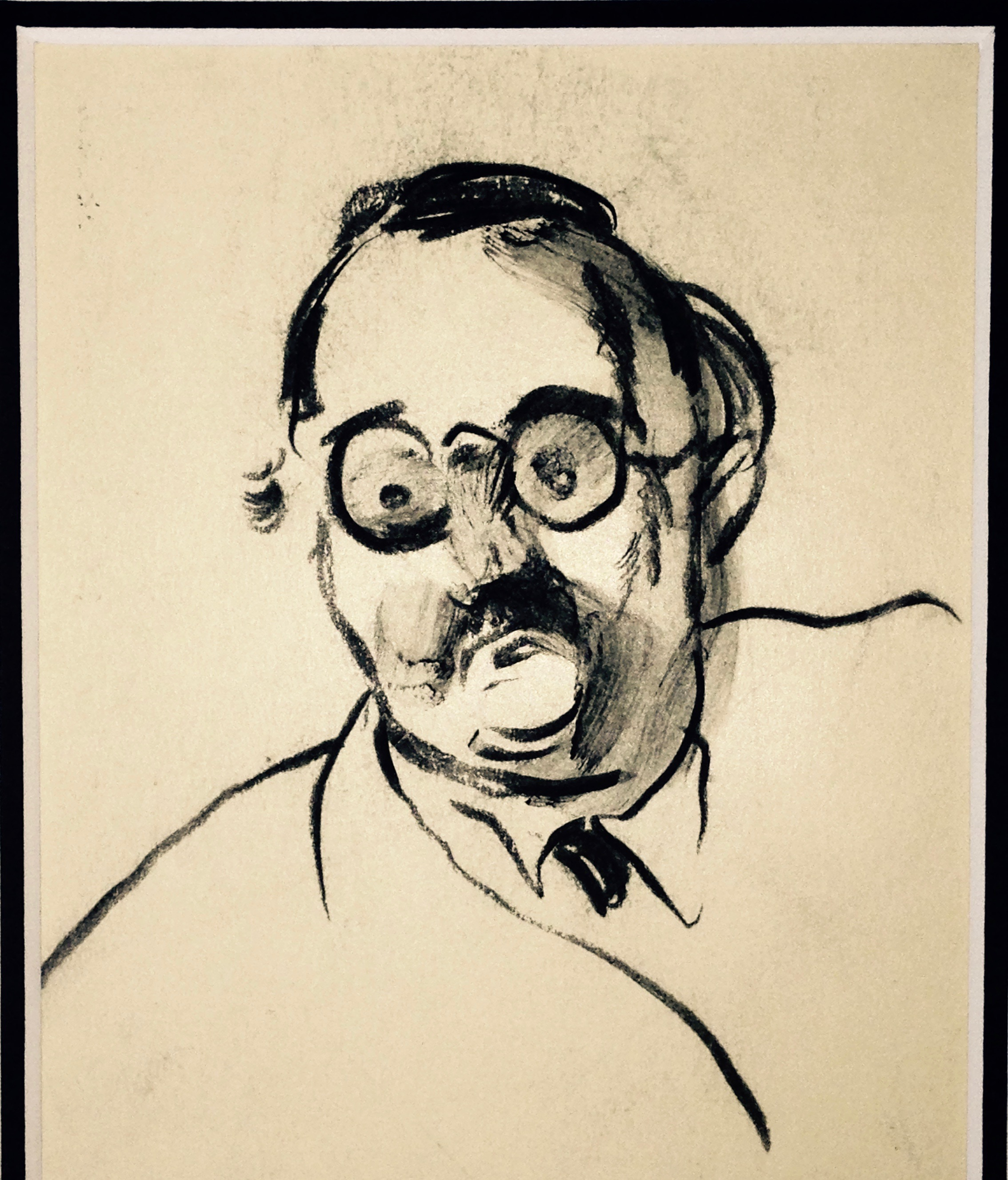
- Darwin as sketched by Group of Seven artist Arthur Lismer
- Born: Robert Vere Darwin; 7 May 1910
- Died: 30 January 1974 (aged 63)
- Known for: artist
- Spouse(s): Yvonne Darby; Ginette Hewitt

Sir Robert Vere Darwin CBE RA RSA (7 May 1910 – 30 January 1974), known as Robin Darwin, was a British artist, President of the Royal Society of Painters in Watercolours, and Rector of the Royal College of Art.

== Life ==
He was the son of the golf writer Bernard Darwin and his wife the engraver Elinor Monsell. One of his sisters was the potter Ursula Mommens. He was a great-grandson of the naturalist Charles Darwin. In 1931, he married artist Yvonne Darby (1900? – 1985). After their divorce, he later married Ginette Hewitt who had been previously married to Lt-Col Kenneth Morton-Evans by whom she had two children.

Darwin was educated at Eton College and Slade School of Fine Art, after which he taught at Eton for five years before designing camouflage in the Ministry of Home Security during the Second World War. After serving as Professor of Fine Art at the University of Durham for two years, he joined the Royal College of Art in 1948, first as principal, then as Rector and Vice-Provost when the college gained university status in 1967. He left this position in 1971 when he became president of the Royal West of England Academy. Throughout his career he also frequently exhibited as well as selling his artwork.

Darwin was made a Commander of the Order of the British Empire in 1954 and was knighted in 1964. He was elected a member of the Royal Academy in 1972.

This charcoal of Robin Darwin was sketched by Canadian artist Arthur Lismer, a member of the Group of Seven. It was given by Darwin to John Bland, former head of McGill's School of Architecture and later Bland gave it to Norman Slater, who studied Architecture at McGill and Industrial Design at the RCA around the same time it was drawn in the early 1950s.
