= Elinor Darwin =

Irish born illustrator, engraver and portrait painter

Elinor Mary Darwin
- Born: Elinor Mary Monsell; 1879; Limerick, Ireland
- Died: 1954 (aged 74–75)
- Resting place: St Mary the Virgin Churchyard, Downe, Kent; 51.336°N 0.054°E
- Education: Slade School of Art
- Known for: Engraver, painter
- Spouse: Bernard Darwin

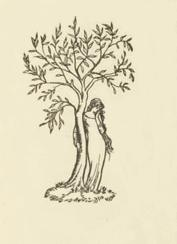
Lady Emer beside a tree, Device of Dun Emer Press, designed by Elinor Monsell about 1903

Elinor Mary Darwin (née Monsell; 1879–1954) was an Irish born illustrator, engraver and portrait painter. Her illustrations were included in several of her husband, Bernard Darwin's books for children.

== Personal life ==
Elinor Mary Monsell was born in Limerick, Munster, Ireland, the eldest daughter of William Thomas Monsell (1843–1887), a magistrate and inspector of facturers, and Elinor Vere, daughter of Hon. Robert O'Brien, of Old Church, Limerick (son of Sir Edward O'Brien, 4th Baronet). William Thomas Monsell's father, Rev. John Samuel Bewley Monsell (1811–1875), vicar of Egham, Surrey, was first cousin to William Monsell, 1st Baron Emly; William Thomas served as Lord Emly's private secretary during his time as Postmaster General.

At 17 years of age Elinor left Ireland for London. Her brother John Robert Monsell was a children's author and illustrator, who collaborated with Herbert Hughes on Rivals!, a 1935 musical version of Richard Brinsley Sheridan's The Rivals.

She married Bernard Darwin on Tuesday, 31 July 1906 at St Luke's Church, Chelsea in London, England. He was a golf writer and grandson of the British naturalist Charles Darwin. Their children were Ursula Darwin (1908–2011) and Sir Robert Vere Darwin (1910–1974).

Prior to World War II many Darwin family members became members of the Eugenics Society. Elinor became one of the Fellows of the Society, as did Leonard Darwin's wife Mildred and other Darwin wives.

She is buried in St Mary the Virgin Churchyard, Downe, Kent; nearby is Down House, the home of the Darwin family. An obituary by Sir Charles Tennyson was published in The Times.

== Education ==
She studied at the Slade School of Art in London, earning a scholarship in 1896.

== Career ==
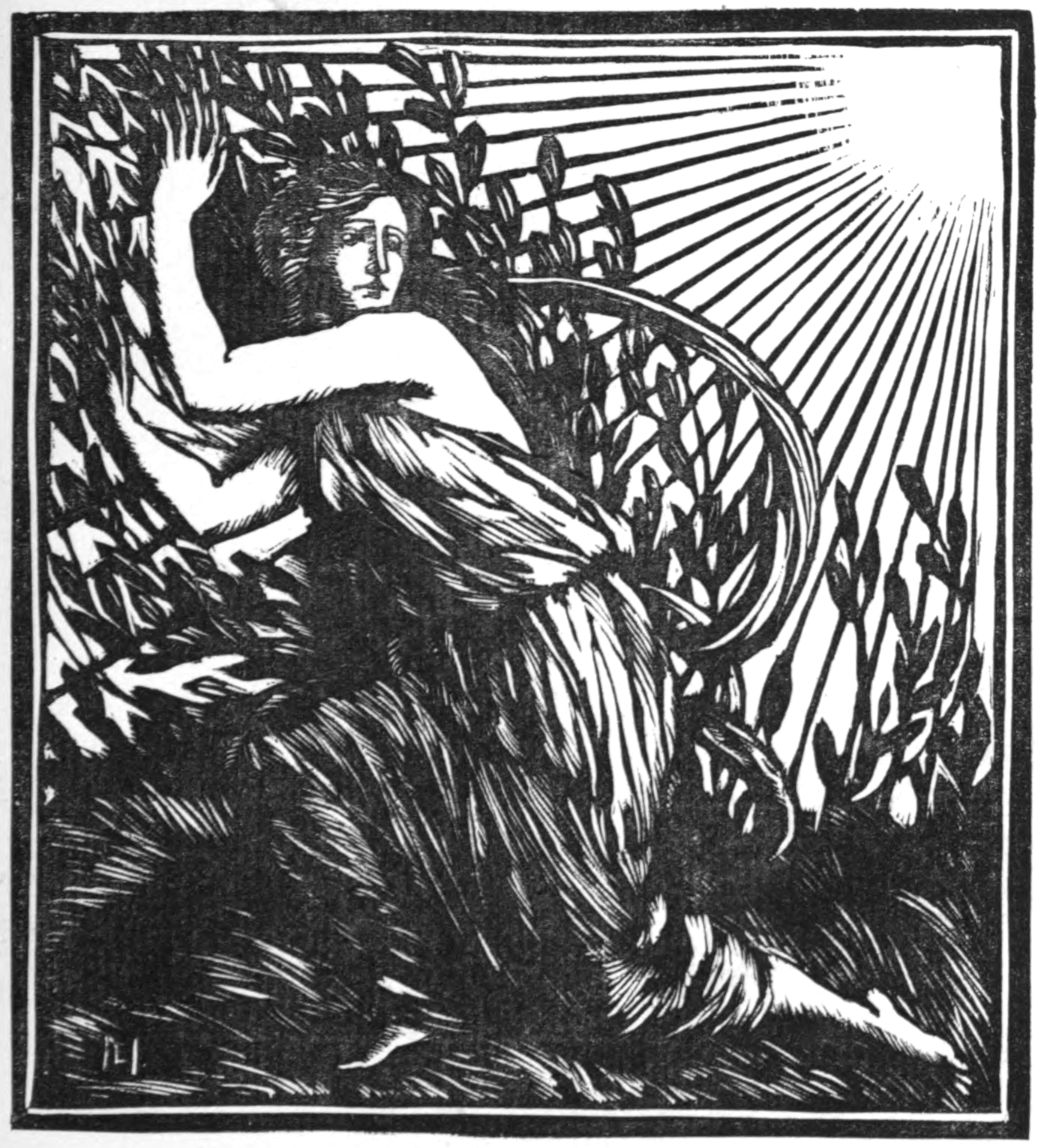
'Daphne and Apollo' woodcut published in The Venture; an Annual of Art and Literature 1903

Elinor was active from about 1899 to 1929. Before she married, Elinor Monsell was one of the illustrators that worked with W. B. Yeats, whom she met in 1899 at Coole Park. He appreciated her woodcuts, and asked her to create a logo for the Abbey Theatre. She created a pearwood engraving of a romantic image of Queen Maeve with one of her wolfhounds that appeared on the Abbey Theatre programmes beginning in 1904. She created the cover for Stephen Gwynn's The Fair Hills of Ireland, which was published in 1906. In 1907 Dun Emer Press's first pressmark was a wood engraving that she made of Lady Emer beside a tree.

She illustrated some of her husband's books for children, such as the Tale Of Mr. Tootleoo, Every Idle Dream, and Mr. Tootleoo and Company. Her illustrations, and those of J.B. Yeats and William Orpen, were included in the Second Annual Volume of The Shanachie, an "Irish Miscellany Illustrated" which included works be many Irish writer, including W. B. Yeats, Stephen Gwynn, Lady Gregory and George Bernard Shaw.

Darwin taught her husband's cousin Gwen Raverat engraving.

Her paintings A Doorway, Child with Toy Bird, and The Annunciation were exhibited in 1913 at the Whitechapel Exhibition of Irish Art in London. She painted a portrait of poet and author Aubrey Thomas De Vere when he was 87 years old.
