= Bernard Darwin =

British golf writer and amateur golfer (1876–1961)

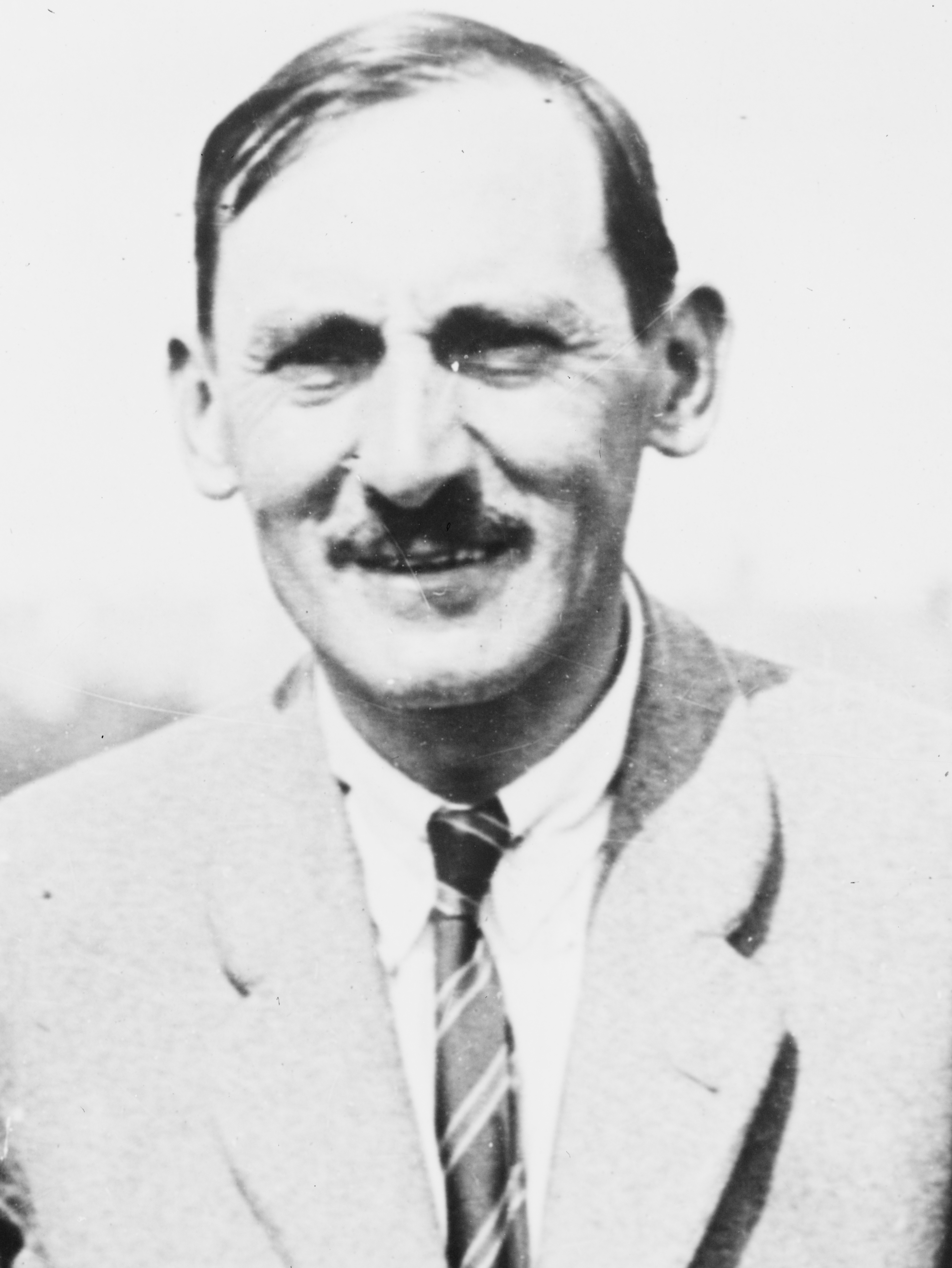
- Bernard Darwin in 1900
- Born: Bernard Richard Meirion Darwin; 7 September 1876; Downe, Kent
- Died: 18 August 1961 (aged 84)
- Occupation: Writer
- Spouse: Elinor Darwin
- Children: Ursula Mommens; Robert Vere Darwin; Nicola Mary Elizabeth Darwin
- Parent(s): Francis Darwin; Amy Ruck

Bernard Richard Meirion Darwin CBE JP (7 September 1876 − 18 October 1961) was a golf writer and high-standard amateur golfer. A grandson of the British naturalist Charles Darwin, he was inducted into the World Golf Hall of Fame.

== Early life ==
Born in Downe, Kent, Darwin was the son of Francis Darwin and Amy Ruck, his mother dying from a fever on 11 September, four days after his birth. He was the first grandson of Charles and Emma Darwin (see Darwin–Wedgwood family), and was brought up by them at their home, Down House. His younger half-sister from his father's second marriage to Ellen Wordswotth Crofts was the poet Frances Cornford.

== Education ==
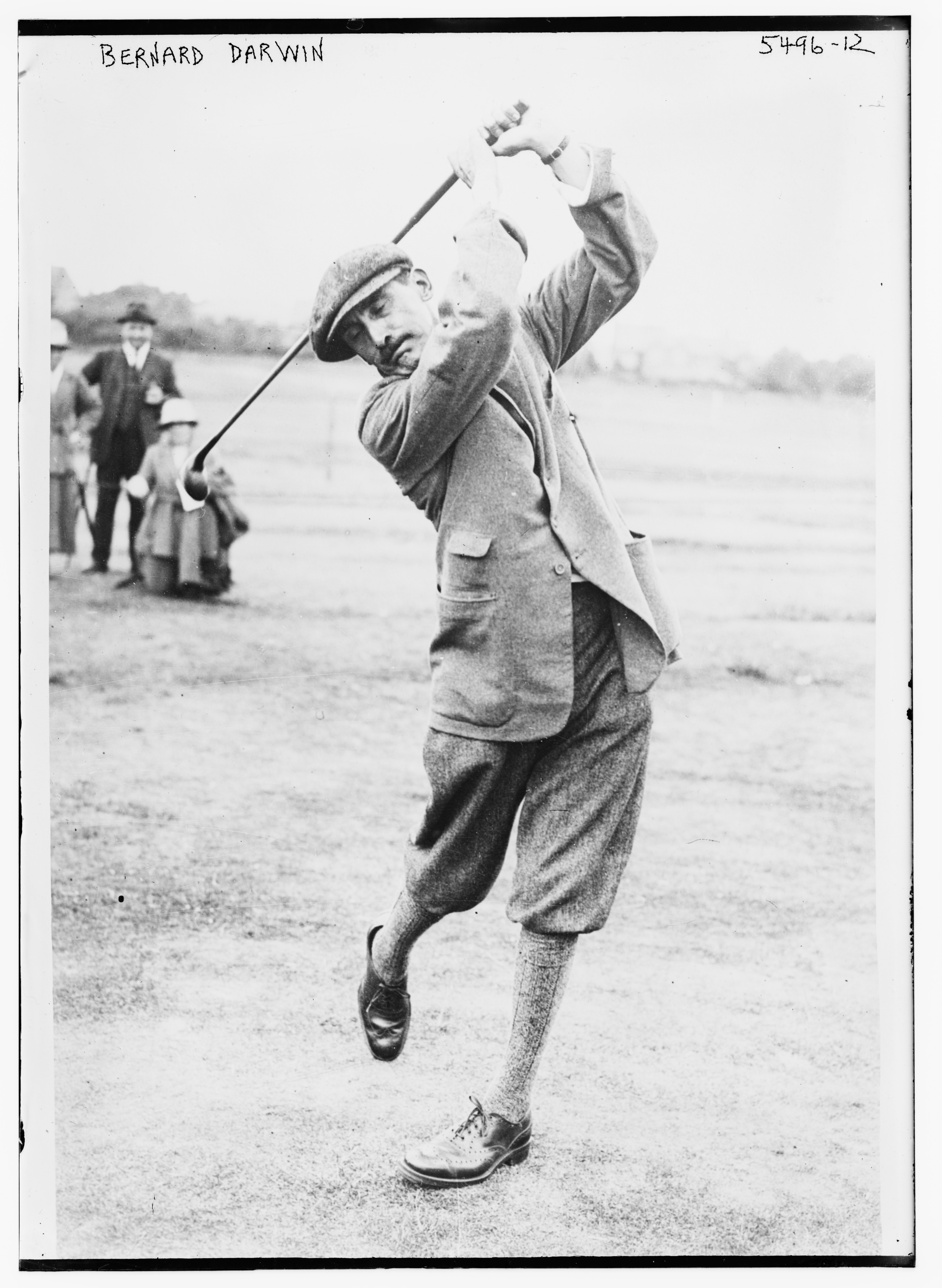
Darwin playing golf in 1900

Darwin was educated at Eton College, and graduated in law from Trinity College, Cambridge, where he was a Cambridge Blue in golf 1895–1897, and team captain in his final year.

== Career ==
After Cambridge, Darwin became a court lawyer, but did not particularly enjoy that career, and gradually moved into journalism, despite having no formal training. He covered golf for The Times from 1907 to 1953 and for Country Life from 1907 to 1961, the first writer ever to cover golf on a daily basis, instead of as an occasional feature.

Darwin's journalism career spanned the Atlantic, most notably including on-scene coverage of the famed 1913 U.S. Open won by American amateur Francis Ouimet over British greats Ted Ray and Harry Vardon. Darwin served as the official marker/scorekeeper for Ouimet in the playoff round. Darwin famously wrote of Ouimet before the playoff round: "He was one David against two Goliaths."

Darwin played the game at an excellent level himself well into middle age, and competed in The Amateur Championship on 26 occasions across five decades between 1898 and 1935, with his best results being semi-final appearances in 1909 and 1921. In 1922, while in the United States to report on the first Walker Cup amateur team match between Britain and Ireland and the U.S., and also appointed as non-playing captain, Darwin was pressed into service at the last minute as a player, when one of the British team members, Robert Harris, was unable to play. He lost his team match, but won his singles match.

He was Captain of The Royal and Ancient Golf Club of St Andrews in 1934, and was President of the Golf Club Managers' Association (then the Association of Golf Club Secretaries) from 1933 to 1934 and then again from 1955 to 1958. Though mainly a golf writer, he also occasionally wrote on cricket, and prefaced the first edition of The Oxford Dictionary of Quotations. He was awarded CBE in the 1937 Coronation Honours.

Bernard Darwin was an authority on Charles Dickens. He frequently contributed the fourth leading article in The Times. The fourth Leader was devoted to flippant themes, and Darwin was known to insert quotes from or about Dickens in them. When Oxford Press issued all classics by Dickens around 1940, each with a foreword by a Dickensian scholar, Darwin was chosen to contribute the foreword to The Pickwick Papers. He was also asked by The Times to pen the main tribute to cricketer W.G. Grace when Grace's birth centenary was celebrated in 1948. The article has been included since in a few anthologies.

Bernard Darwin's works were kept in print by Herbert Warren Wind through his curated Classics of Golf Library.

In 1947, Bernard Darwin wrote 'A Century of Medical Service' about the work of the GWR Medical Fund Society. The society was founded in 1847 and was being disbanded in 1947, with the arrival of the NHS. The society provided a complete medical service for workers in the Swindon rail works and their families.

== Personal life ==
Darwin married the engraver Elinor Monsell in 1906. They had one son, Sir Robert Vere Darwin, and two daughters; the potter Ursula Mommens, and Nicola Mary Elizabeth Darwin, later Hughes (1916–1976). During the First World War he served with the Royal Army Ordnance Corps in Macedonia as a lieutenant.

== Death ==
Darwin is buried in St Mary the Virgin Churchyard, Downe, Kent.

== Award and honors ==
In 2005, Darwin was elected to the World Golf Hall of Fame, in the Lifetime Achievement category.

== Amateur wins ==
- 1896 Linskill Cup
- 1919 Golf Illustrated Gold Vase

== Results in major championships ==
Note: Darwin played in only The Amateur Championship.

Tournament	1898	1899
The Amateur Championship	R32	R16

Tournament	1900	1901	1902	1903	1904	1905	1906	1907	1908	1909
The Amateur Championship	DNP	DNP	R32	R64	R32	DNP	DNP	DNP	QF	SF

Tournament	1910	1911	1912	1913	1914	1915	1916	1917	1918	1919
The Amateur Championship	R128	R16	R16	R128	R128	NT	NT	NT	NT	NT

Tournament	1920	1921	1922	1923	1924	1925	1926	1927	1928	1929
The Amateur Championship	R256	SF	R64	R128	R256	R64	DNP	R256	R256	R64

Tournament	1930	1931	1932	1933	1934	1935
The Amateur Championship	R512	R32	R128	R128	DNP	R128

NT = No tournament
DNP = Did not play
R512, R256, R128, R64, R32, R16, QF, SF = Round in which player lost in match play
Yellow background for top-10

== Team appearances ==
- Walker Cup (representing Great Britain): 1922
- England–Scotland Amateur Match (representing England): 1902, 1904, 1905, 1908, 1909, 1910 (winners), 1923, 1924 (winners)

== List of works ==
- The Golf Courses of the British Isles (Duckworth, 1910) illustrated by Harry Rountree
- Tee Shots and Others (Kegan Paul, 1911) illustrated by E. W. Mitchell
- Golf from The Times (The Times, 1912)
- Erasmus Darwin: Born 7 December 1881, killed in action 24 April 1915
- Golf: Some Hints and Suggestions (Country Life, 1920)
- A Friendly Round (Mills & Boon, 1922)
- A Round of Golf on the London & North Eastern Railway (Ben Johnson & Co., 1924)
- The Tale of Mr. Tootleoo (Nonesuch Press, 1925) with Elinor Darwin, for children
- The Games's Afoot! An Anthology of Sports, Games and the Open Air (Sidgwick & Jackson, 1926) editor
- Eton v. Harrow at Lord's (Williams & Norgate, 1926) see Eton v Harrow
- Tootleoo Two (Nonesuch Press, 1927) with Elinor Darwin, for children
- Six Golfing Shots by Six Famous Players (Dormeuil Freres, 1927)
- Green Memories (Hodder & Stoughton, 1928)
- Second Shots: Casual Talks About Golf (Newnes, 1930)
- The Dickens Advertiser: A Collection of the Advertisements in the Original Parts of Novels by Charles Dickens (Elkin Mathews & Marrot, 1930)
- Out of the Rough (Chapman & Hall, 1932)
- Dickens (Duckworth, 1933) Great Lives series
- W. G. Grace (Duckworth, 1934) Great Lives series
- Playing the Like (Chapman & Hall, 1934)
- Mr. Tootleoo and Co. (Faber & Faber, 1935) with Elinor Darwin, for children
- Life is Sweet Brother (Collins, 1940) reminiscences
- Pack Clouds Away (Collins, 1941)
- British Clubs (Collins, 1943) Britain in Pictures series
- Golf Between Two Wars (Chatto & Windus, 1944)
- The Robinsons of Bristol 1844-1944 (E. S. & A. Robinson, 1945)
- British Golf (Collins, 1946) Britain in Pictures series
- Golfing By-Paths (Country Life, 1946)
- Fifty Years of Country Life (Country Life, 1947) history of Country Life magazine
- A Century of Medical Service (Great Western Railway Medical Fund Society, 1947)
- Every Idle Dream (Collins, 1948) illustrated by Elinor Darwin
- James Braid (Hodder & Stoughton, 1952)
- A History of Golf in Britain (Cassell, 1952) editor
- The World That Fred Made (Chatto & Windus, 1955) autobiography
- Golf Is My Game (Chatto & Windus, 1961) with Bobby Jones

=== Other publications ===
- A Round with Darwin: A Collection of the Golf Writings (Souvenir Press, 1984)
- Darwin on the Green (Souvenir Press, 1986)
- Historic Golf Courses of the British Isles (Duckworth, 1987)
- The Darwin Sketchbook: Portraits of Golf's Greatest Players and Other Selections (Classics of Golf, 1991) from his writings, 1910–1955
- The Happy Golfer (Classics of Golf, 1997) his best articles from The American Golfer magazine, 1922–1936
- Bernard Darwin on Golf (Rowman & Littlefield, 2003) edited by Jeff Silverman ISBN 1-58574-768-8
