= Breadsall =

Coordinates: 52.954°N 1.450°W

- Village and civil parish
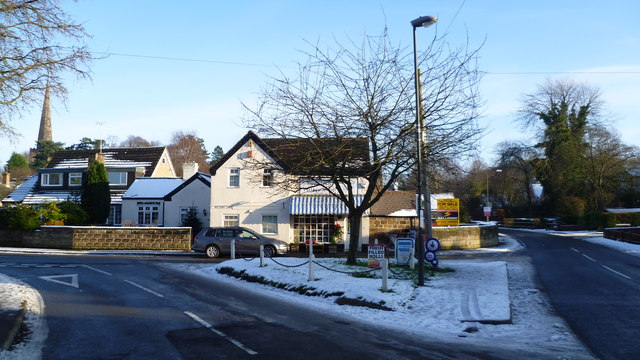
- Breadsall village with spire of All Saints Church in background.

- Location within Derbyshire
- Population: 792 (2021)
- OS grid reference: SK370397
- District: Erewash
- Shire county: Derbyshire
- Region: East Midlands
- Country: England
- Sovereign state: United Kingdom
- Post town: DERBY
- Postcode district: DE21
- Dialling code: 01332
- Police: Derbyshire
- Fire: Derbyshire
- Ambulance: East Midlands
- UK Parliament: Mid Derbyshire

Breadsall is a village and civil parish in the Borough of Erewash in Derbyshire, England. The population of the village at the 2021 census was 792. Breadsall Priory is one of the oldest buildings in the village. The village is almost contiguous with both Derby to the south and southeast and Little Eaton to the north.

== History ==
Breadsall was mentioned in the Domesday Book of 1086 as belonging to Henry de Ferrers and being worth four pounds. The text includes reference to a knight, a church, meadows and a mill. The church of All Saints has a war memorial in the style of a Celtic cross within the churchyard, commemorating fourteen men who died during the First World War and nine men and one woman who lost their lives during the Second World War.

== Modern day ==
The village is as a thoroughfare with traffic calming measures and has road connections to Hilltop, Morley, West Hallam, Heanor and Ilkeston. As well as Derby and Ripley.

The village is well served by regular bus services including: Trentbarton which run services to Derby and Mansfield via Ripley, Alfreton and Sutton in Ashfield. Additionally, there are also bus services to Ilkeston via the Ilkeston Hospital to Derby that run through the village and Belper which are run by Notts and Derby buses.

Amenities include a coffee shop on the main road to the south of the village, a community centre, Breadsall Church of England Primary School, which moved to a brand new building on Brookside Road in February 2023, and a Scout hut, situated just off Brookside Road.

Breadsall has large village playing fields. Breadsall Cricket Club has been on this site since the 1950s. The club currently has 2 senior teams competing in the Derbyshire County Cricket League, a XI team and a junior training section that play competitive cricket in the Erewash Young Cricketers League.

The population of the village is approximately 773 and the parish church of the village, All Saints' Church is a grade I listed building.

== Notable residents ==
- Erasmus Darwin (1731–1802) a natural philosopher, physiologist, abolitionist, inventor, freemason, and poet; lived and died at Breadsall Priory. buried in Breadsall churchyard.
- Francis Sacheverel Darwin (1786–1859), a physician, traveller and naturalist, son of Erasmus Darwin
- Joseph Whittaker (1813–1894), botanist
- Henry Harpur-Crewe (1828–1883), an English clergyman and naturalist,.was rector here
- Sir Alfred Seale Haslam (1844–1927), engineer who lived in Breadsall Priory, he devised a refrigeration plant used to transport food in ships, MP and Mayor for Newcastle-under-Lyme

== See also ==
- Listed buildings in Breadsall
