= Henry Harpur-Crewe =

English naturalist and clergyman (1828–1883)

- Born: 30 September 1828
- Died: 7 September 1883 (aged 54); Drayton Beauchamp
- Known for: Naturalist
- Title: Reverend

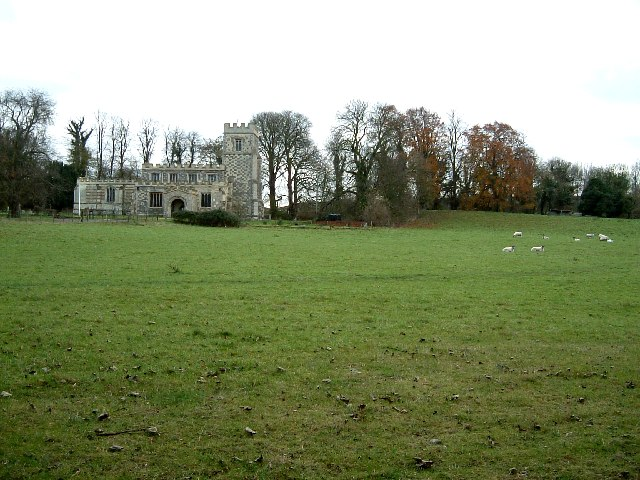
His church in Drayton Beauchamp

Henry Harpur-Crewe (1828–1883) was an English clergyman and naturalist. From 1856 to 1860 he was the Curate of Drinkstone and Creeting St Peter, both in Suffolk, but in 1860 he was appointed Rector of Drayton Beauchamp, a living he occupied until his death in 1883.

== Biography ==
Henry Harpur-Crewe was the son of Reverend Henry Robert Crewe (né Harpur), Rector of Breadsall in Derbyshire, and nephew of Sir George Crewe bt. of Calke. He obtained a BA degree from Trinity College, Cambridge in 1851 and an MA in 1855 In 1857 his father was the rector of Breadsall in Derbyshire, a small village which also included the naturalists Joseph Whittaker and Francis Darwin.

He was interested in natural history from an early age, contributing observations to The Zoologist. His main interest was in entomology, particularly pug moths (Eupithecia). He was also a good botanist and a keen horticulturist (especially crocuses).

One of his partners in botany was Joseph Whittaker of Breadsall and Morley who had practised botany in South Australia. In 1846 Harpur-Crewe and Whittaker reported on the earlier local extinction from Derbyshire of the lady's slipper orchid Cypripedium calceolus. Whittaker's plant collecting activities began to decline around 1863 at about the time Crewe moved away to take up the position of rector in the parish of Drayton Beauchamp in Buckinghamshire. In 1864 they cooperated in the production of a manuscript list of the principal flowering plants and ferns of Derbyshire. His productive partnership with Crewe lasted for at least eighteen years.

In 1877 Harpur-Crewe reported on a visit he made to Tresco in the Scilly Isles where he commented on the insects which was where "all the plants of Australia, the Cape, New Zealand, &c., flourish with almost native luxuriance."

== Legacy ==
Harpur-Crewe's plant collection are in the Natural History Museum whilst his letters are at Kew Gardens. The Wisbech and Fenland Museum also has a small collection of Crewe's plants. A miniature yellow double leafed wallflower Erysimum cheiri was rediscovered by Harpur-Crewe and is now named "Harpur Crewe".
