= Joseph Whittaker =

British botanist

- Born: 1813; Breadsall
- Died: 2 March 1894 (aged 80–81)
- Education: nurseryman
- Occupations: schoolmaster, nurseryman
- Known for: Flora of Australia, Flora of Derbyshire
- Spouse: Mary

Joseph Whittaker (1813 – 2 March 1894) was a British botanist who visited South Australia in 1839. Whittaker has 300 plants from that trip in Kew Gardens and a large collection of pressed British plants in Derby Museum and Art Gallery.

== Biography ==
=== Early days ===
Whittaker's exact birth date is not known. He was christened at Quarndon near Derby on 8 February 1813. His father, also named Joseph, was a labourer, married to Sarah (born Clarke). The son is sometimes reported as being born in Breadsall in 1815.

=== Australian botany ===
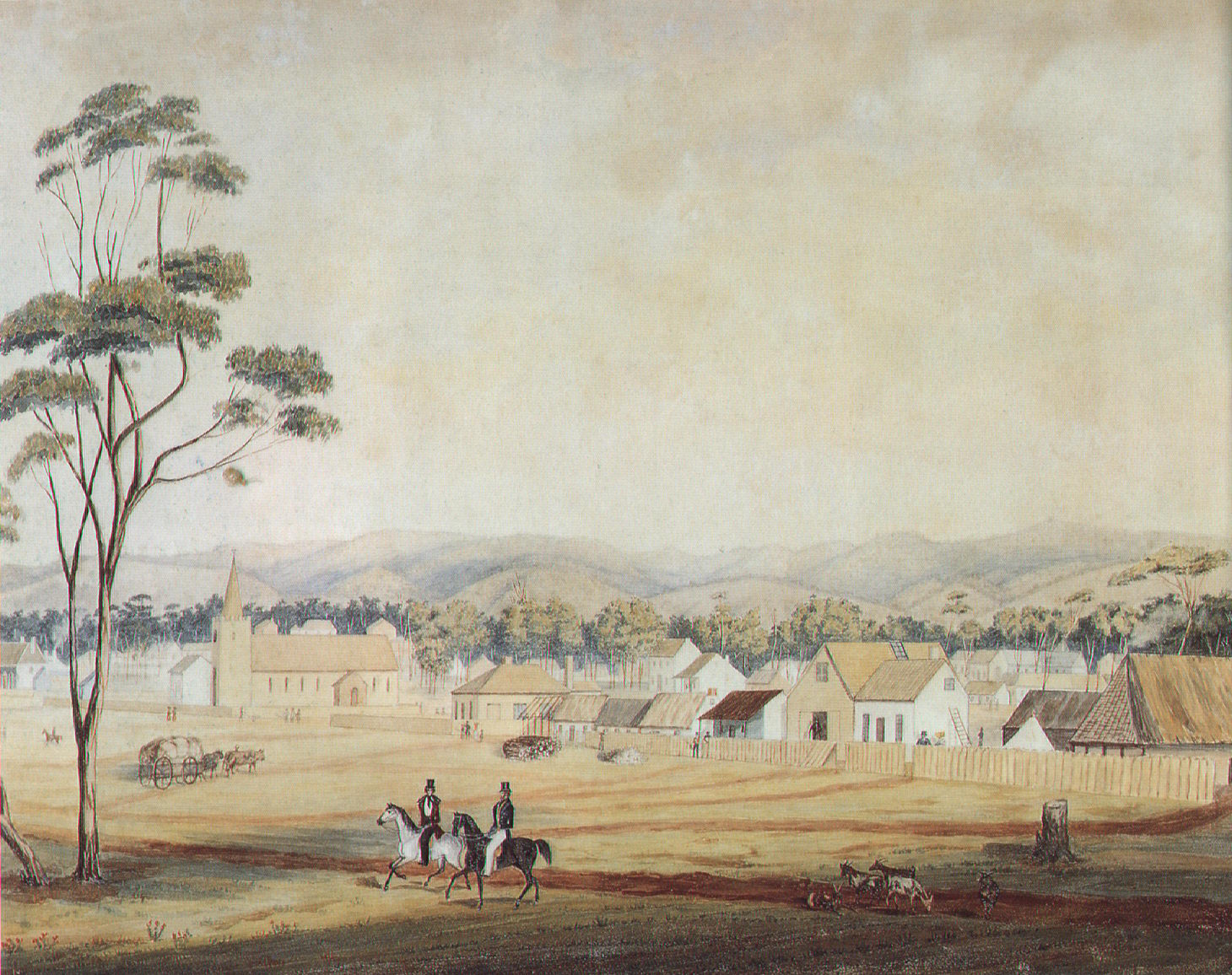
Adelaide in 1839 where Whittaker was a gardener

In 1838 Whittaker gave his occupation as "gardener" when he set sail with his new employer Lt. Col. George Gawler, who had recently been appointed as the second Governor of South Australia. Whittaker, seven other employees from Derbyshire, Gawler and his wife and children arrived on the Pestonjee Bomanjee on 12 October 1838 in Adelaide. They had made a four-month journey via Tenerife and Rio de Janeiro. When Whittaker and Gawler arrived they found that conditions were poor, so gardening was not the top priority.

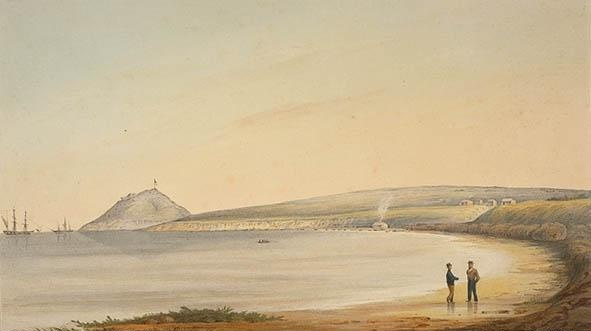
The Cos Fishing Station in Encounter Bay in 1838 after William Light

He is known for the plants that he collected around Adelaide in South Australia in 1839–40. During breaks in his employment Whittaker travelled to many places within South Australia where he collected and preserved a wide range of plant specimens. These included Mount Lofty range, Mount Jagged, River Torrens, River Murray and the Hindmarsh River. Whittaker was the first person to seriously collect from the mountainous district of the Fleurieu Peninsula, Encounter Bay and Mount Barker.

Whittaker stayed in South Australia for nineteen months before sailing home on Katherine Stewart Forbes, which set sail from Port Adelaide on 11 April 1840. On the way home his boat stopped four times: at Kangaroo Island, Mauritius, St Helena and Corvo Island in the Azores. Whittaker collected and pressed further plant specimens whilst the boat was in these harbours.

=== Derbyshire botany ===
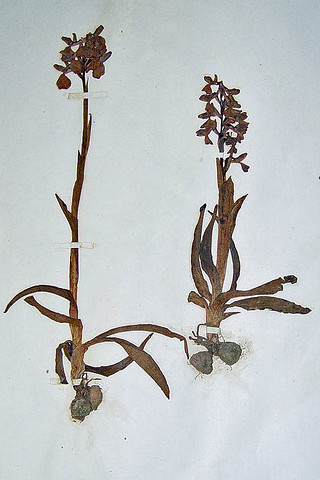
Orchis morio (green-winged orchid). one of Whittaker's pressed plants in Derby Museum herbarium

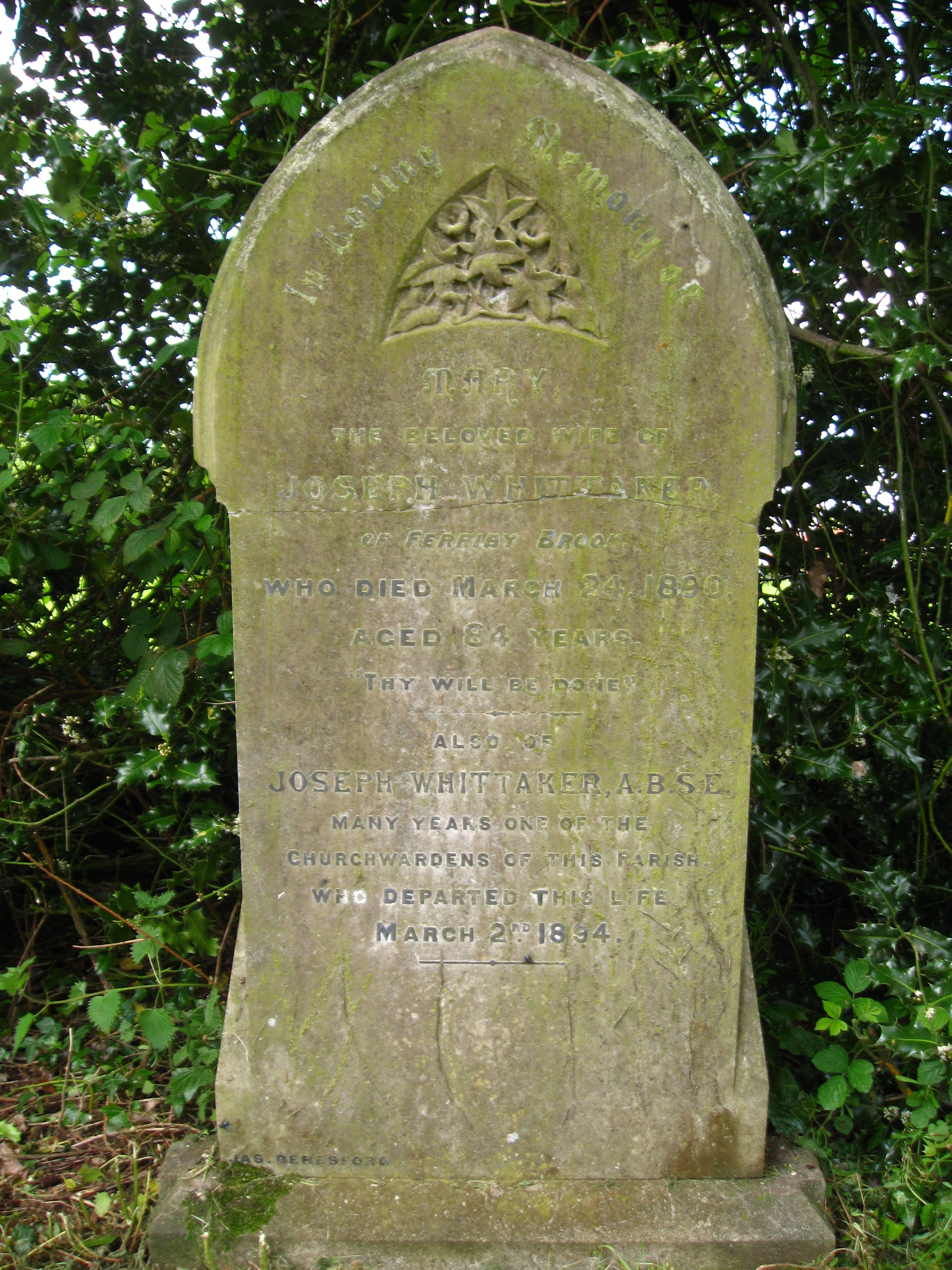
Gravestone of Joseph Whittaker, A.B.S.E. in Morley, Derbyshire

Whittaker arrived back in England on 23 September 1840 and by 1844 had begun collecting plants again. His activity peaked in 1851 and 52, ceasing sometime after 1867. He collected from many parts of Derbyshire, but he occasionally travelled outside the county including Bulwell, Nottinghamshire, Rhyl and Denbigh in Wales.

By 1846 he was living at Breadsall in Derbyshire, where he was a schoolmaster at Breadsall Boys School. From here he corresponded with Sir William J. Hooker Director of the Kew Botanic Gardens in an attempt to exchange some of his Australian and related specimens for a number of books on British botany. Whittaker collected approximately 300 plants that were eventually acquired by Kew. Whittaker's collections from outside the U.K. and related correspondence are now in Kew Gardens. This includes specimens of a new species of sundew, Drosera whittakeri, which was subsequently named after him.

In February 1847 Whittaker was elected a member of the Botanical Society of London and he contributed specimens to its exchange schemes between 1849 and 1853. He subsequently joined the Botanical Exchange Club and eventually the Botanical Locality Record Club. By 1847 he had amassed enough botanical information to publish "a list of rare plants found in the neighbourhood of Breadsall, Derbyshire". This contained a mixture of both rare and relatively abundant species, and gives a good indication of the botanical diversity of the area at that time. In 1857, he was the schoolmaster of ninety children at Breadsall in Derbyshire, a village whose inhabitants included the naturalists Rev. Henry Harpur Crewe and Francis Darwin. The school was funded by the Harpur-Crewe family.

Whittaker lived in the small village of Morley near Derby at Ferriby Brook (the name of his house) with his wife Mary in the late 1850s. He continued to teach here, taking up to twelve scholars into his classes, usually after they had left the local school, and were between eight and eighteen years of age. He eventually established a large collection of living plants. Local horticultural groups reported he was growing over 1,300 different species. In 1864, he was publishing works noting the local extinction of the lady's slipper orchid, Cypripedium calceolus, with the Rev. Henry Harpur Crewe. By 1871 he was no longer a schoolmaster, and is then listed as a "seedsman and florist". By 1881 these returns described him as a "nurseryman and farmer", with two servants living in his house, plus twenty-year-old William Whitehead. Whitehead was to eventually become a partner in their market gardening venture. Whittaker was elected an 'Associate' of the Botanical Society of Edinburgh, and remained on its membership listings from at least 1881 until 1891.

Whittaker's plant collecting activities began to decline around 1863, around the time his botanical partner, Henry Harpur Crewe, moved away to become the Rector of Drayton Beauchamp in Buckinghamshire. In the following year they cooperated in the production of a manuscript list of the principal flowering plants and ferns of Derbyshire. His partnership with Crewe lasted for at least eighteen years and was very productive. The Harpur Crewe's family seat were based at nearby Calke Abbey and they had funded the school at Breadsall.

In the late 1880s Joseph Whittaker gave valuable assistance, and supplied a range of plant specimens, to Rev W. H.Painter who was preparing to publish a book on the Flora of Derbyshire. Many of Whittaker's specimens and records were also used by William Richardson Linton, vicar of Shirley in a further Flora of Derbyshire in 1903.

Whittaker died on 2 March 1894 and a memorial lectern and engraved brass plaque were erected by popular subscription for St Matthew's Church, Morley (Church of England), where he was a church warden and where he was buried.

== Legacy ==
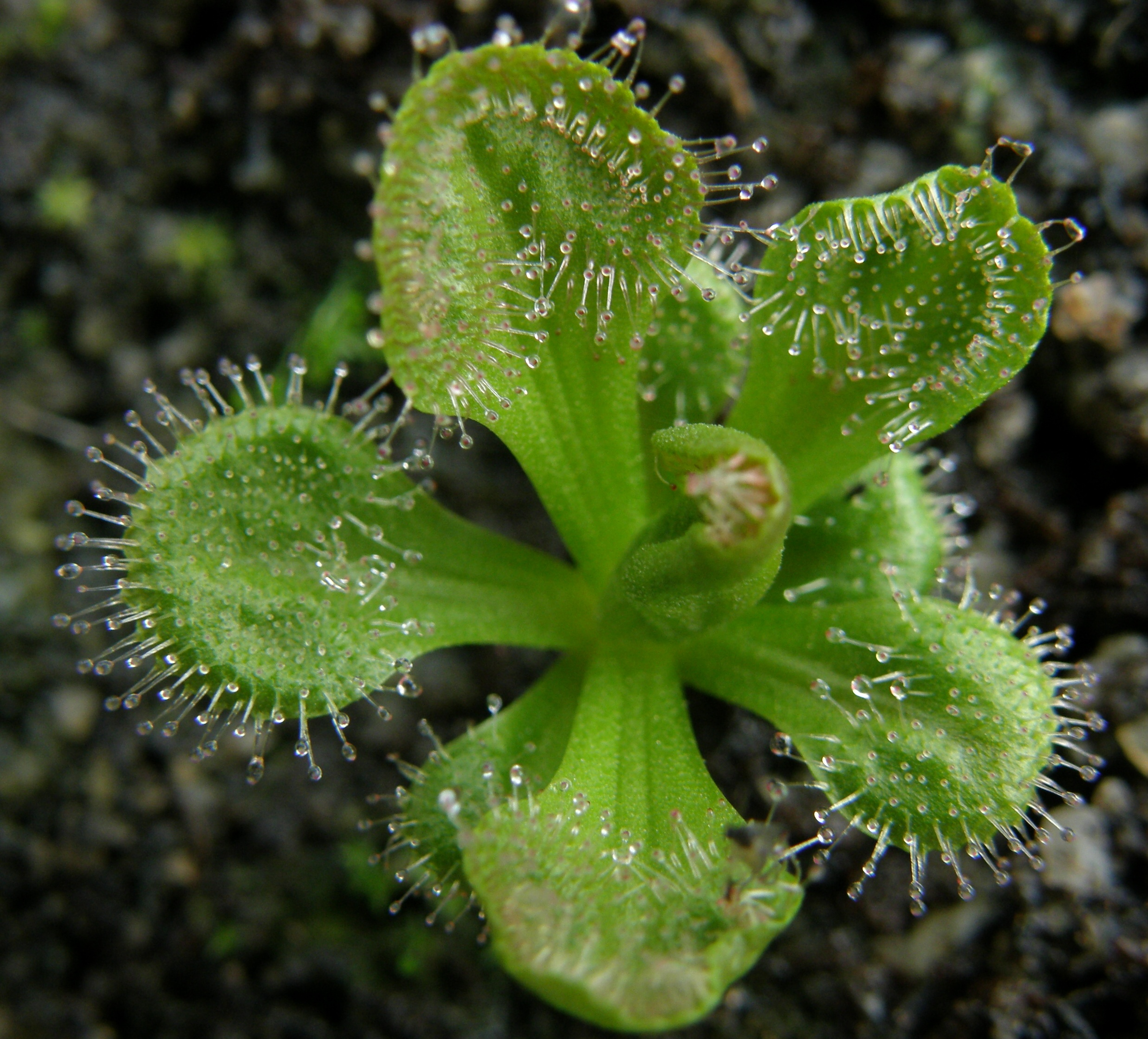
Drosera whittakeri, also known as Whittaker's sundew, or scented sundew.

Whittaker's collection of herbarium specimens at Kew Gardens is from his trip to Australia and from ports of call on his return journey home. On his death a large collection of pressed British plants in 79 volumes, mostly from Derbyshire, were passed to Derby Museum and Art Gallery, and these are now incorporated in their herbarium. They provide important voucher specimens for local studies on the Flora of Derbyshire. Because of his participation in botanical exchanges clubs, there are now Whittaker specimens in many UK museum collections, including those at Bolton, Birmingham, Gloucester and Manchester. The Wisbech and Fenland Museum also has a small collection.

The carnivorous sundew species Drosera whittakeri was scientifically described by the French botanist Jules Émile Planchon in 1848. This is commonly known as the scented sundew or Whittaker's sundew.
