= Philip Tindal-Carill-Worsley =

Philip Ernest Tindal-Carill-Worsley (nė Frank; 21 October 1881 – 18 March 1946) was an English lawyer and landowner.

Philip Frank was the second son of Ernest Frank of Pendleton, near Manchester. He was educated at Eton and Magdalen College, Oxford. He was called to the bar at the Inner Temple in 1905. In 1907 he married Clementia Tindal-Carill-Worsley, only daughter of Nicolas Tindal-Carill-Worsley of Platt Hall, near Manchester, adopting his father-in-law's name and arms by Royal Licence. They had two sons (Air Cdre Geoffrey Tindal-Carill-Worsley CB CBE (1908–1996) and Lt Col. Peter Gilbert Norman Tindal-Carill-Worsley (1910–2012)) and a daughter. During World War I he served with the Shropshire Yeomanry and the Royal Engineers Signals, serving as a staff officer and reaching the rank of major.

He was High Sheriff of Norfolk in 1937, Justice of the Peace for Norfolk, and during World War II he served as commandant of the Norfolk Special Constabulary. He was also sometime chairman and trustee of the Norfolk and Norwich Hospital.

He resided at The Dower House, East Carleton, Norfolk. In Who's Who, he listed his recreations as "Hunting, shooting, ski-ing, stalking, fishing".

A portrait by Elliott and Fry is in the collection of the National Portrait Gallery.
