= Lady Darwin =

Lady Darwin may refer to:

- Jane Harriet Ryle (1794–1866), wife of Sir Francis Sacheverel Darwin
- Ida Darwin (1854–1946), wife of Sir Horace Darwin
- Maud Darwin (1861–1947), wife of Sir George Darwin
- Florence Henrietta Darwin (1864–1920), 3rd wife of Sir Francis Darwin
- Katharine Pember Darwin (1901–1986), mathematician, wife of Sir Charles Darwin
- Ginette Darwin (?-2006), 2nd wife of Sir Robin Darwin
