= James Collins Hawker =

English-born explorer and surveyor

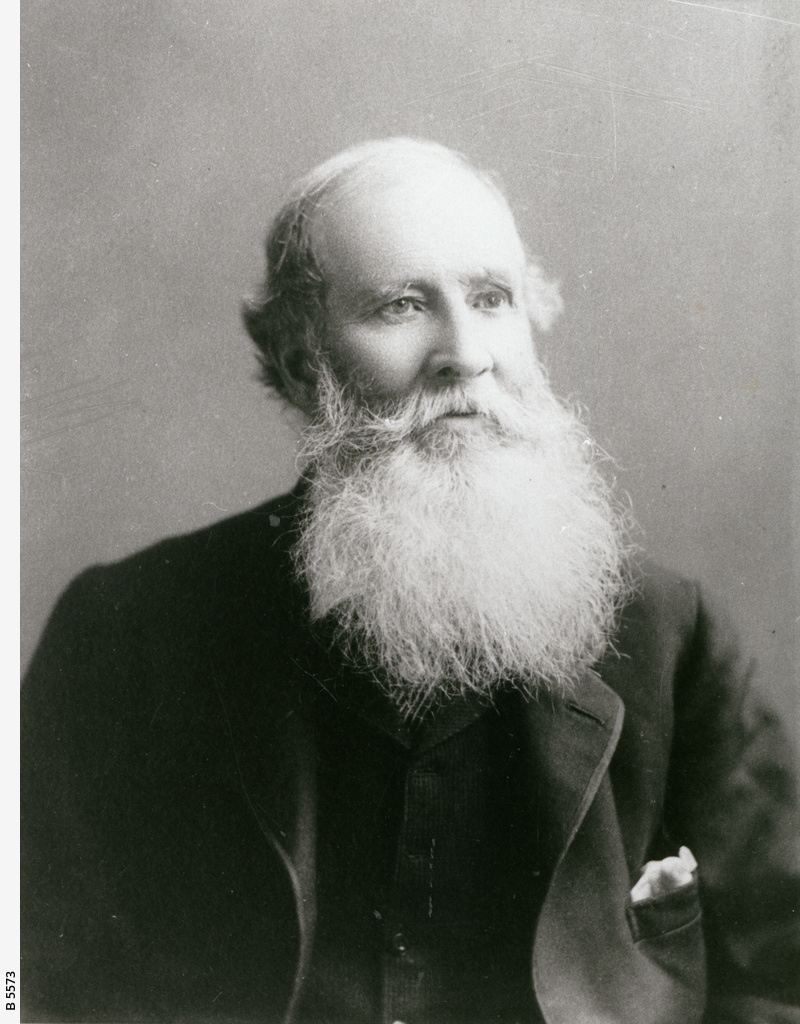
- Born: 10 April 1821; Catsfield, England.
- Died: 15 May 1901 (aged 80)
- Occupations: explorer, surveyor, aide-de-camp, diarist, author, settler
- Notable work: Early Experiences in South Australia

James Collins Hawker (1821-1901) was an English-born explorer, surveyor, diarist and pastoralist of South Australia, aide-de-camp to Governor George Gawler, and subsequently Comptroller of H.M. Customs at Port Adelaide.

== Early life ==
Hawker was born in Catsfield, England. He was a son of Admiral Edward Hawker, R.N. After an educational career in French, Swiss, and Italian academies, his education was completed at the High School in Tavistock Square, London.

He had two brothers, George Charles Hawker and Charles Hawker, with both of whom he settled in Australia in 1841.

== Australia ==
Hawker sailed to South Australia in 1838 with George Gawler, who was an old friend of his father, and who was to succeed Captain Hindmarsh, R.N., the first viceregal representative in the colony. Gawler had made an offer to Hawker's father to take one of his sons to South Australia with him when he took up his new post. They arrived in Port Adelaide, described as a "wretched mudhole", in October. There he met harbormaster (and his future father-in-law) Capt. Thomas Lipson, R.N., accompanied the new Governor on his official entry into the city, and witnessed the swearing-in at the viceregal residence.

In December 1838, Hawker joined the party which conducted a survey on the Sturt River, led by J. W. McLaren who became Deputy Surveyor-General of South Australia. Hawker was the fourth officer in that party, and subsequently led a survey party on the Onkaparinga River. Among the officers was draftsman John McDouall Stuart, later noted as an explorer. Hawker executed surveys in other parts of the colony, before resigning and returning to Government House to assist in the Private Secretary's office. He was present at the public dinner given to Colonel Gawler in 1840, and later in that same year he left for England in the ship Katherine Stewart Forbes.

Finding that his two brothers, George and Charles, had themselves only just left for Australia, Hawker returned almost immediately to join them, sailing on the barque Siam. Leaving England in December 1840, he arrived back at Holdfast Bay in South Australia on 25 April 1841.

Within ten days of arriving, Hawker had volunteered to accompany a party which went out to retrieve 5,000 sheep left near Chowilla by overlanders Henry Inman (his future brother in law), Henry Field and nine others after being attacked by local Aboriginal people. One attacker was shot dead before Inman, Field and the other overlanders escaped, the fate of the sheep unknown. The retrieval party found themselves opposed by about 300 warriors, and fired at the attackers, killing eight, and wounding several more before they retreated. They returned without the sheep, Field slightly wounded, and his horse badly speared. Hawker subsequently went out as commissary under command of Police Commissioner O'Halloran, their force succeeding in protecting other settlers who had been attacked and in retrieving their animals.

Hawker soon settled down with his two brothers, and all three engaged in sheep-farming, initially at Mount Dispersion, near Anlaby Station, north of Nuriootpa. On 22 December 1841 he discovered a permanent water supply in the Mid-North of South Australia at Bungaree, which was improved by sinking a well, and transferred his stock there. In 1843, James Hawker sold his share in the Bungaree Station to his brother George, and relocated to Moorundie on the River Murray. He, along with E. J. Eyre (explorer and later Governor of Jamaica) plus E. B. Scott (one-time superintendent of Yatala Labour Prison) were the first three settlers on the Murray. However, his speculation proved unsuccessful, in 1847 Hawker took up a post with H.M. Customs at Port Adelaide, becoming tide surveyor and eventually comptroller in 1862.

In 1860 Hawker founded Port Adelaide's first rowing club, called the "Pelican Club", of which he was captain and an oarsman for many years. Their Patron was Lady MacDonnell, whose name graced one of their two boats.

== Diaries and publications ==
Hawker compiled diaries over much of his life, originally publishing them as articles that appeared in the South Australian Register and the Adelaide Observer. He subsequently published them in two books:

- Early Experiences in South Australia (1899), Adelaide: E.S. Wigg and Son.
- Early Experiences in South Australia, Second Series (1901), Adelaide: E.S. Wigg and Son.

The 1899 series gave detailed accounts of his journey to Australia on board the Pestonjee Bomanjee, his years there, the many acquaintances he met, including assisting the renowned ornithologist John Gould during his studies in 1839, and of his return to England on board the Katherine Stewart Forbes. The second series recounted his experiences for the years immediately after his return to Australia in 1842, including the establishment of the Bungaree station.

== Family and later life ==
On 24 October 1850 at Trinity Church, Adelaide, Hawker married Louisa Lipson (1829 – 5 August 1918), youngest daughter of Capt. Lipson R.N., Harbourmaster at Port Adelaide.

In August 1872, Hawker retired from the customs branch, and went into private commercial life, establishing the business of land and station agency and surveyor. He also became a respected Freemason. At the time of his death in 1901, his business was continuing under the name of James C. Hawker & Son.

In his later years Hawker lived a quiet life at Strangways-terrace, North Adelaide. He died on 15 October 1901 and was buried at North Road Cemetery. He left a widow, three sons, and five daughters.
