= Edward Levett Darwin =

- Born: 12 April 1821
- Died: 23 April 1901 (aged 80)
- Parent(s): Francis Sacheverel Darwin; Jane Harriet Ryle
- Relatives: See Darwin–Wedgwood family

Edward Levett Darwin (12 April 1821 – 23 April 1901), known by his pen-name High Elms, was an English writer and solicitor who authored The Game-preserver's Manual: Containing Instructions in All That Relates to Getting Up and Maintaining a Good Head of Game (1859), which shows observation of the habits of various animals, and went through at least five editions.

== Biography ==
Darwin was the son of Sir Francis Sacheverel Darwin and his wife Jane Harriet Ryle. He was a cousin of Sir Francis Galton and half-cousin of Charles Darwin, their shared ancestor being their grandfather, physician and poet Erasmus Darwin. He grew up at Breadsall Priory, England.

Darwin was a captain in the Derby Regiment of Militia from 1856. In 1850 he married Harriett Jessopp, (1825 – 1889), daughter of Francis (once Derby's solicitor and an attorney, owner of Jacobean House and under-sheriff for the county of Derbyshire) and Ann Jessopp of Derby. The 1851 Census records Darwin and his wife residing at Dale House in Matlock Bath with his occupation as solicitor, while Kelly's Directory of 1855 records him as a solicitor living in Matlock Bath. Darwin had settled in the area where Erasmus Darwin had recommended the waters to Josiah Wedgwood.

Darwin is buried along with his wife in the churchyard of St John the Baptist's Church at Burbage, Derbyshire.
