= Delta Hotels by Marriott Breadsall Priory Country Club =

Country house in Breadsall, Derbyshire, England

Breadsall Priory
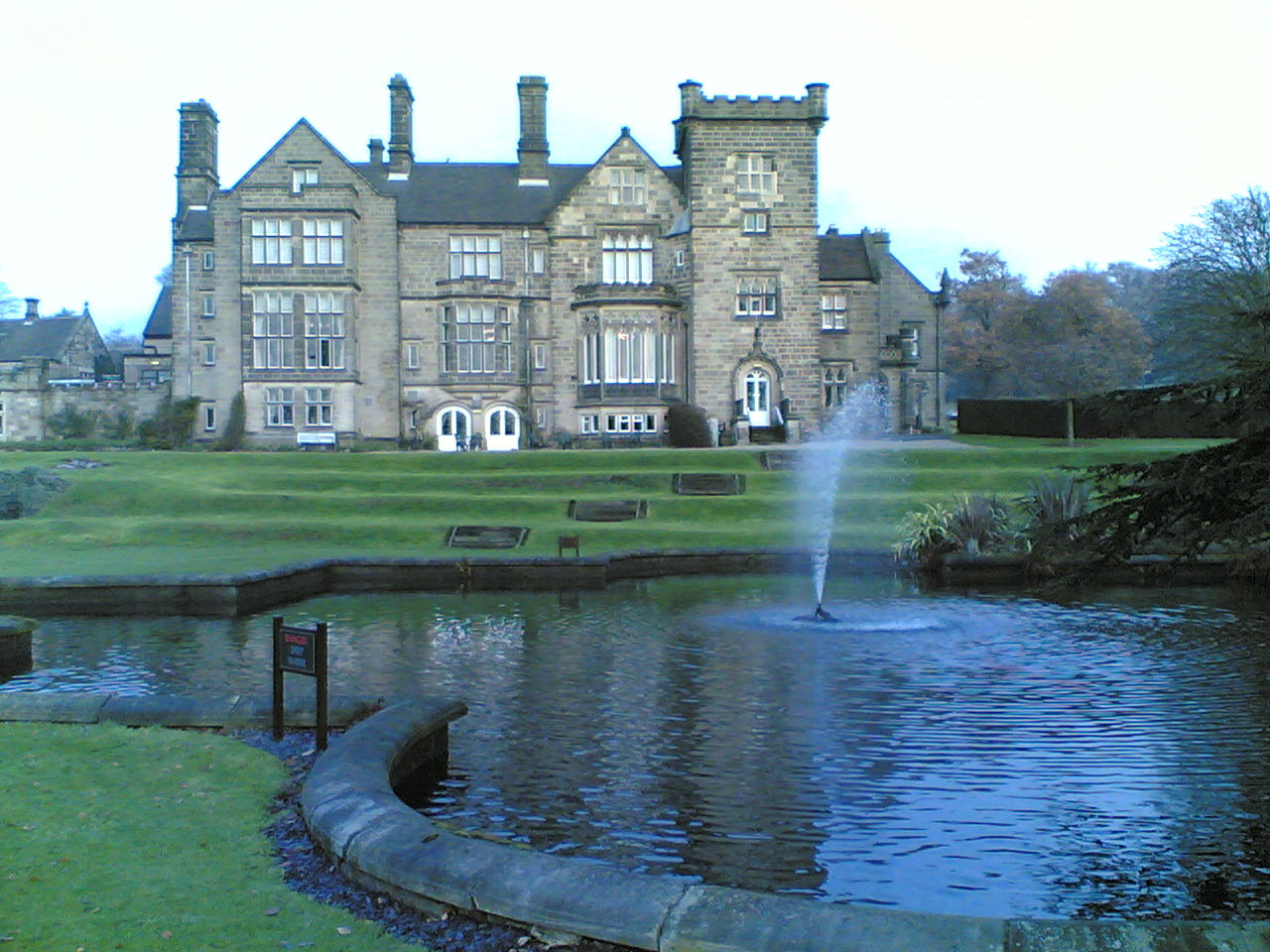
- Breadsall Priory in December 2005

- Location within Derbyshire

Monastery information
- Full name: The Priory of the Holy Trinity, Breadsall
- Other name: Breadsall Park Priory
- Order: Augustinian Canons
- Established: Before 1266
- Disestablished: 1536
- Dedication: The Holy Trinity
- Controlled churches: Breadsall, Duffield, Horsley, Mugginton and Windley.

People
- Founders: Richard, Henry or Sir Robert Curzon

Site
- Coordinates: 52.96862°N 1.43564°W
- Grid reference: SK380414
- Visible remains: A single 13th-century arch remains from the original priory buildings, within the cellars of the later building constructed on the site.

Breadsall Priory is a former Augustinian priory in Derbyshire, situated around two kilometres north of Breadsall, and two kilometres east of Little Eaton. The priory was established before 1266 by a member of the Curzon family. Only a small priory, Breadsall was dissolved in 1536. It is currently a luxury hotel operated by Marriot as Delta Hotels by Marriott Breadsall Priory Country Club .

Following dissolution the priory was demolished and a private home, also known as Breadsall Priory, built on the site; the house was altered and extended in both the 19th and 20th centuries, and only a single arch remains of the monastic buildings. The house and its stables are both Grade II Listed. The house is currently used as a hotel, while its stables are in residential use.

== History ==
Breadsall Priory was established before the middle of the 13th century by one of three generations of the Curzon family: Richard, Henry or Sir Robert Curzon (grandfather, son and grandson).

Many sources often mistakenly refer to Breadsall as being a house of Augustinian Friars (also known as Friars Eremites), due to a mistake made on a Patent Roll in 1266. Breadsall was in fact home to Augustinian Canons; a fact confirmed by King Henry III's grant of 20 acres of land in Horsley and Horston: Augustinian Friars could not own any land other than what their priory sat upon; Augustinian Canons, however, could freely own land.

Breadsall Priory was very small. Breadsall was usually home to only the prior and two canons, and the taxation roll of 1291 reveals that the priory had an annual income of only £5 19s. However, Breadsall was frequently home to just the prior and one canon, or just the prior alone. The small number of canons made it impossible to elect a prior, meaning one was often chosen by a member of the Curzon family, who served as "hereditary patrons". The Curzon family were Lords of the Manor of Breadsall Overhall for eight generations.

During the reign of King Richard II (1377–1399), the manor passed to the Dethick family, through the marriage of Cecilia Curzon to William Dethick. However, the Dethick family's relationship to the priory was, for a period, unclear. In 1384, the appointment of the prior was made by Sir Thomas Wendesley, who was referred to as Patron pro hac vice. Several other priors were also appointed by the Bishop of Lichfield, rather than the Dethick family. However, in 1456 the bishop confirmed Sir William Dethick's right to "the first licence to elect or provide a superior when the priory was vacant".

In 1402 William Dethick, son of Cecilia Curzon, donated a moiety of the rectory of Mugginton to Breadsall. Dethick had, however, failed to follow proper procedure to alienate the lands; thus, upon his death, his "executors and trustees" were "heavily fined" by the crown.

In 1444, Breadsall Priory was sued by the Collegiate Church of St Mary in Leicester, over the tithes of a field called "Hethfield", near Mugginton. St Mary's argued that the field belonged to the Parish of Duffield (which was in their control), and not that of Mugginton (controlled by the priory). The court found in favour of St Mary's and control of the field passed to the collegiate church. The rector of Mugginton was "condemned for contempt of Court of Arches" and ordered to pay the 40s. to St Mary's.

In 1448, Prior Thomas Breadsall complained to the Bishop of Lichfield that "certain charters and evidences which particularly affected the interests of William Dethick" had been stolen from the priory. The bishop ordered that at high mass in several local churches, the priests should spread the news of the theft, and instruct that the perpetrators were to be excommunicated unless the items were returned within 15 days. Its unclear whether this strategy worked.

In 1453, John Statham of Morley agreed to donate money to repair the roof of the priory church and the glazing in the clerestory. In return, Prior Thomas Breadsall agreed that the priory would celebrate mass annually, on the feast of the Eleven Thousand Virgins, for the souls of Goditha, Thomas, Elizabeth Cecilia and John Statham.

In 1454, a canon at Breadsall, John Derby (who was "probably a gifted preacher"), was granted a licence from Reginald Boulers, Bishop of Coventry and Lichfield to travel around the diocese preaching in its parish churches.

The Valor Ecclesiasticus of 1535 records Breadsall Priory had an annual income, after expenses, of £10 17s. 9d., and was in control of the parishes of Breadsall, Duffield, Horsley, Mugginton and Windley. The prior, William Pendylton, was the only resident at the priory at the time.

The priory was dissolved in 1536. Pendylton, was awarded a "minute pension" of only 5 marks a year.

Of the original priory buildings, only a single 13th-century arch remains, in the cellars of the later building constructed on the site.

== Priors ==
A list of the known priors of Breadsall.

- Hugh de Mackworth. Appointed in 1306: "under the patronage of Richard Curzon".
- Hamund de Merston. Appointed in 1309. Also chosen by Richard Curzon.

Reappointed in 1322. This time chosen by Henry Curzon.

- William de Repyndon. Formerly a canon at Breadsall. Resigned as Prior in October 1347.
- Thomas de Castello. Appointed in 1347 on the advice of the Abbot of Darley Abbey.
- Thomas de London. Appointed in 1365 after the position of Prior had been vacant for several years. Previously a monk at Burton Abbey.
- Geoffrey de Stafford. Resigned in 1370.
- Thomas Lewes. Appointed in 1370.
- Roger Upton. Appointed in 1384.
- Thomas Holand (also known as Thomas Bakster). Served 1431–1442.
- Thomas Beadsall. Served 1442–1456.
- Robert Burton. Served October 1456 – 1487. Formerly a canon at Repton Priory. Selected by Sir William Dethick.
- Henry Halom. Appointed in 1487.
- John Alton. Died in office, 1519.
- Thomas Beyston. Appointed in 1519.
- William Pendyltion. Appointment date unknown. Name appears in 1535, when he was the only resident at the priory. Surrendered the priory for dissolution and awarded "minute pension" at dissolution, of 5 marks a year.

== History after dissolution ==
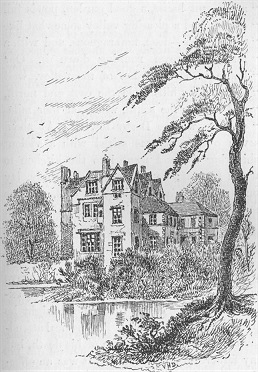
A line drawing of Breadsall Priory, by Francis S. Darwin's daughter Violetta H. Darwin (1826–1880)

Following dissolution, some of Breadsall's lands were transferred to Darley Abbey. However, Darley was also dissolved soon after, and the land passed to the Crown. By September 1536, the priory site itself was leased by the Crown, and being farmed by, Lawrence Holland of Belper. Following the Dissolution of the Monasteries in 1536, the site was granted by the Crown to the Duke of Suffolk.

Breadsall subsequently passed through numerous owners. In the late 16th century, when under the ownership of Sir John Bentley, an Elizabethan "E-plan" house was constructed on the former priory site. The original house, also known as Breadsall Priory, was altered and extended by architect Robert Scrivener around 1861, and a new wing was added in 1906. The house's stable buildings were constructed in the mid-19th century.

The physician and poet Erasmus Darwin, grandfather of Charles Darwin, moved to Breadsall shortly before his death in 1802. The house was subsequently home to his son Sir Francis Sacheverel Darwin (1786–1859). Sir Francis' son Edward Levett Darwin, author of the Gameskeeper's Manual (under the pseudonym "High Elms"), learnt natural history in its grounds.

Later, Derby industrialist Sir Alfred Seale Haslam (1844–1927), (Mayor of Derby 1890/91, Member of Parliament for Newcastle-under-Lyme 1900/6) acquired the house. His son Eric Seale Haslam was High Sheriff of Derbyshire in 1937.

The building is currently a Marriott hotel, with two 18-hole golf courses: one set in parkland and is called the Priory Course; the other is called the Moorland Course. In 2005, the priory hosted a G8 summit meeting of environment and development ministers.

The house was Grade II Listed on 2 September 1952. The associated stables, built in the mid-19th-century, are in residential use. The stables were Grade II Listed on 6 November 1986.

== See also ==
- Listed buildings in Breadsall

== Sources ==
- English Heritage: Images of England, photograph and architectural description of listed building
- History and Gazetteer of the County of Derby Pt 1 Vol 2 (1829) Stephen Glover p 152 (Google Books): Breadsall Priory
- Haslam Papers at National Archives (Derbyshire Record Office) ref GB/0026/D1333
