= All Saints' Church, Breadsall =

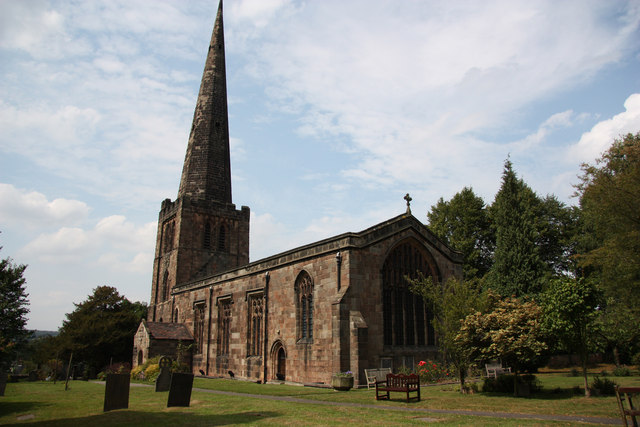
- All Saints' Church, Breadsall (photograph by Richard Croft)
- All Saints' Church, Breadsall
- 52°57′15.48″N 1°26′56.76″W
- Location: Breadsall
- Country: England
- Denomination: Church of England

History
- Dedication: All Saints

Architecture
- Heritage designation: Grade I listed

Administration
- Province: Canterbury
- Diocese: Derby
- Archdeaconry: Derby
- Deanery: Derby City
- Parish: Breadsall

All Saints' Church, Breadsall is a Grade I listed parish church in the Church of England in Breadsall, Derbyshire.

== History ==
The church dates from the 12th century with 13th- and 14th-century features. The church was restored in 1830 and again in 1877–1886 by Frederick Josias Robinson, the diocesan architect, when a new chancel arch was built, the nave was reroofed, new seating installed, and the walls were cleaned of plaster and whitewash. The north aisle was also restored.

The church was severely damaged by a fire which was started by Suffragettes on 5 June 1914. The fire virtually gutted the building leaving the tower and spire in an insecure condition, and the walls only standing, the glass in the windows were totally destroyed, and the stone in the walls damaged. It was restored by the architect W. D. Caröe and the contractor Cornish and Gaymer of North Walsham, and reopened on 14 April 1916.

The physician Erasmus Darwin is buried here. One of the key thinkers of the Midlands Enlightenment, he was also a natural philosopher, physiologist, slave-trade abolitionist, inventor and poet. He was a grandfather of the evolutionist Charles Darwin.

== Organ ==
The pipe organ was installed by Alexander Buckingham in 1834 which was later modified by Wadsworth. A specification of the organ from 1914 can be found on the National Pipe Organ Register shortly before it was destroyed by fire. The church now has an electronic organ.

== See also ==
- Grade I listed churches in Derbyshire
- Listed buildings in Breadsall
