= Pestonjee Bomanjee (1834 ship) =

Wooden sailing ship (1834–1861

Pestonjee Bomanjee was a wooden sailing ship built in 1834, by James Lang of Dumbarton, Scotland. She was a three-masted wooden barque of 595 tons, 130 feet in length, 31.5 feet in breadth, first owned by John Miller Jnr and Company, Glasgow. Her last-known registered owner in 1861, was Patrick Keith & George Ross, Calcutta, India.

Pestonjee Bomanjee was built for East India service, and undertook a number of journeys between the United Kingdom and the Australian colonies.

In 1838, she undertook a journey from London to the colony of South Australia, carrying with her George Gawler, who had been appointed as the second Governor of South Australia, in succession to Captain John Hindmarsh, who had been recalled. Gawler and his wife, children, gardener (Joseph Whittaker), and future aide-de-camp (James Collins Hawker) arrived on Pestonjee Bomanjee on 12 October 1838, after a four-month journey to Adelaide via Tenerife and Rio de Janeiro. Also on the ship were the German Lutheran missionaries Christian Gottlieb Teichelmann and Clamor Wilhelm Schürmann.

In 1841, her master, Captain Stead, was attacked and murdered by a gang of Chinese villagers in the Chusan Islands.

For the latter part of her service she was used as a convict ship. In 1848, Pestonjee Bomanjee was felted and her hull sheathed in yellow metal to protect it from marine growths. On Thursday 15 March 1849, an advertisement appeared on the Sydney Morning Herald “For London the fine ship Pestonjee Bomanjee , 595 tons, John Baker commander will sail in March. Apply to the captain on board, March 7, 1849."

== Voyages ==
- 1838 Sailed London to Holdfast Bay, S Australia. Captain J K Hill.
- 1845, 1847, 1849 & 1852 voyages to Van Dieman's Land (Tasmania) as a convict ship.
- 1845 Departed Woolwich, England 6 September 1845; Arrived 30 December 1845 Captain Jn Austin. Surgeon: J. W. Johnston.
- 1846/1847 Departed 8 October 1846; arrived Van Diemen's Land (Maria Island) 17 February 1847.
- 1848/1849 Departed 20 September 1848; arrived 2 January 1849 at Van Diemen's Land. Disembarked 298 female Irish prisoners
- 1849 Sailed for Hobart Town. Captain Baker
- 1850/1851 Departed London via Portsmouth 30 October 1850; Arrived Port Adelaide 17 February 1852 Captain Ed.Pavey
- 1852 Departed Plymouth 18 April 1852; Arrived Hobart 31 July 1852. Master: Captain Edward Montgomery. Surgeon: Daniel Ritchie.
- 1854 Emigrant voyage. Departed Southampton 18 June 1854; Arrived Port Adelaide, South Australia 7 October 1854. Captain Edward Montgomery. Surgeon: William H. Motherall.
