= Marcus Bourne Huish =

Marcus Bourne Huish (25 November 1843 – 4 May 1921) was an English barrister, writer and art dealer.

He was the son of Marcus Huish of Castle Donington and his wife Margaret Jane Bourne. His mother died in 1847 and in 1849 his father remarried Frances Sarah Darwin, daughter of Sir Francis Sacheverel Darwin. Bourne was the editor of The Art Journal from 1881 to 1892 and was the first managing director of the Fine Art Society. He was a Japanophile and was given the honour of Chevalier of the Order of the Sacred Treasure. He was the Honorary Librarian of The Japan Society of the UK.

== Books ==
- Charles Méryon, sailor, engraver, and etcher : a memoir and complete descriptive catalogue of his works / translated from the French of Philip Burty by Marcus B. Huish. Charles Méryon et son œuvre.English. Fine Art Society. 1879.
- Japan and its art. The Fine art society, limited. 1889.
- Birket Foster; his life and work. Art Journal Office. 1890; 32 pages
- Chinese snuff bottles of stone, porcelain, and glass utilized to uprear a fabric of fancies concerning China and the Chinese, by Marcus B. Huish, arts-man to the Sette of odd volumes. 1895.
- Huish, Marcus Bourne (1898). Old Stuart genealogy : a paper read before ye Sette of Odd Volumes February 5th, 1897 : in ye first year of ye reign of His Oddship Sir Stuart Knill, Baronet, and ye sixtieth year of ye reign of Her Majesty Queen Victoria / by Marcus B. Huish.
- Greek terra-cotta statuettes, their origin, evolution, and uses. J. Murray. 1900.
- Happy England as painted by Helen Allingham, R.W.S. With memoir and descriptions, by Marcus B. Huish. A. and C. Black. 1903.
- British water-colour art. The Fine art society, A. and C. Black. 1904.
- Catalogue of an exhibition of the arms and armour of old Japan, held by the Japan Society, London, in June 1905. The Japan Society. 1905.
- American pilgrim's way in England to homes and memorials of the founders of Virginia, the New England States, and Pennsylvania, the Universities of Harvard and Yale, the first President of the United States & other illustrious Americans. The Fine art society. 1907.
- Fifty years of new Japan (Kaikoku gojūnen shi) comp. by Count Shigénobu Ōkuma... English version ed. by Marcus B. Huish. E.P. Dutton & company. 1909.
- Samplers & tapestry embroideries. Longmans, Green and co. 1913.
- Great war in 1916, a neutral's indictment; sixty cartoons by Louis Raemaekers, with an appreciation by H. Perry Robinson, and descriptive notes by E. Garnett and M. B. Huish. 1917.
