= Alfred Seale Haslam =

British politician

Sir Alfred Seale Haslam
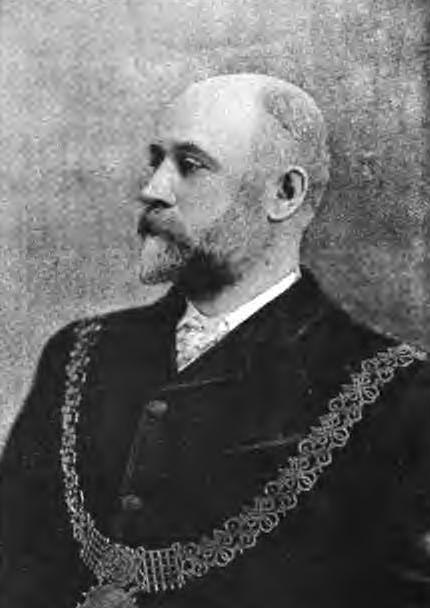
- Sir Alfred Seale Haslam in 1891
- Born: 27 October 1844; Derby, Derbyshire, England
- Died: 13 January 1927 (aged 82); St Pancras, London, England
- Resting place: Morley, U.K.
- Occupation: Politician
- Parent: William Haslam

Sir Alfred Seale Haslam (27 October 1844 – 13 January 1927) was an English engineer who was Mayor of Derby from 1890 to 1891, three times Mayor of Newcastle-under-Lyme, and Member of Parliament (MP) for Newcastle-under-Lyme from 1900 to 1906. He had made his money from devising a refrigeration plant that could be used to transport food in ships worldwide. At one time he owned and lived at Breadsall Priory in Derbyshire. His son Eric Seale Haslam was High Sheriff of Derbyshire in 1937.

== Life ==
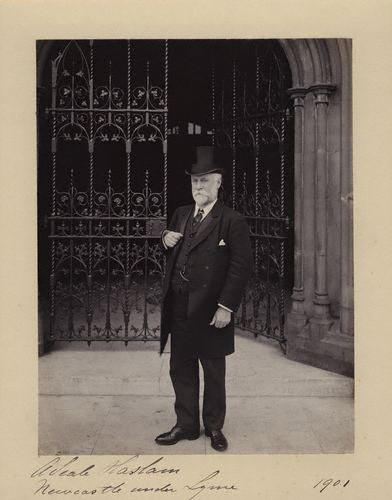
Haslam at the Palace of Westminster in 1901 by John Benjamin Stone

Alfred Seale Haslam was the fourth son of William Haslam, an iron-founder. He trained as an engineer and took over the Union Foundry in 1868 in partnership with his father, running it by himself from 6 February 1873 after his father retired from the partnership. It became the Haslam Foundry and Engineering Company Ltd in 1876.

Haslam started his civic life in 1879 when he was elected a councillor for Derby and some years later a Justice of the Peace. During the year that he was Mayor of Derby he managed to replace the old William Strutt Infirmary with the Derbyshire Royal Infirmary. In 1890 there had been an outbreak of disease at the old infirmary and Sir William Evans, President of the Infirmary arranged a three-day inspection which condemned the old building. When Queen Victoria came to lay the foundation stone for the new hospital on 21 May 1891 she knighted Haslam for his services and gave permission for the term "Royal" to be used.

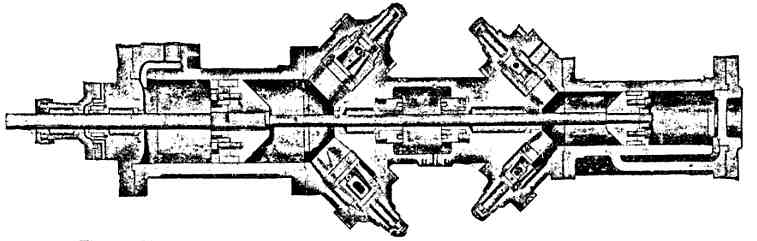
Haslam's 1894 patent application shows the novel compressor

In 1894 Haslam had made a patent application for a new type of compressor for ammonia. Using this compressor, the gas was compressed in stages without much leakage, enabling refrigerated transportation of food in ships. He started transporting meat from the British Antipodean colonies and for the next fourteen years, "held a virtual monopoly of British marine meat refrigeration".

The portrait shown here is by John Benjamin Stone who started the National Photographic Record Association. Haslam was a member of this association and his son Victor was also an active member.

In 1896 he funded a statue of Queen Victoria by Charles Bell Birch at the north end of Blackfriars Bridge in London. Haslam made a similar donation to create a statue in his constituency of Newcastle-under-Lyme in 1903. Haslam had a third erected in Derby. There were seven other casts, all of which were based on a marble original which was erected in India.

Haslam was elected a Member of Parliament for Newcastle-under-Lyme in 1900, serving one term until 1906. He attended the 1903 Delhi Durbar as a guest of the Viceroy, Lord Curzon.

Haslam was Master of the Worshipful Company of Coachmakers & Coach Harness Makers in London in 1904.

On 27 March 1917, Haslam's 24-year-old son Captain William Kenneth Seale Haslam was killed in action in France while serving with 4th (North Midland) Brigade, Territorial Force, Royal Field Artillery. He was buried in the Tilloy British Cemetery, Tilloy-lès-Mofflaines, Pas de Calais. His son Captain Eric Seale Haslam was an officer in the same artillery unit from 1913, but survived the war, and was High Sheriff of Derbyshire in 1937.

== Death and legacy ==
Haslam died at the Midland Grand Hotel in St Pancras, London, aged 82.

Haslam was buried in Morley in Derbyshire and he left over one million pounds in his will. Haslam's has a portrait in the National Portrait Gallery in London. The archaeologically interesting St Mary's Bridge Chapel in Derby was renovated using funds from the Haslam family in his memory. Breadsall Priory was in Haslam ownership until 1967 when it was sold by the executors of Haslam's only surviving son Eric. Eric had continued the business as the Derby Pure Ice and Cold Storage Company.

Parliament of the United Kingdom
Preceded by William Allen	Member of Parliament for Newcastle-under-Lyme; 1900–1906	Succeeded by Josiah Wedgwood
