= Listed buildings in Breadsall =

Breadsall is a civil parish in the Erewash district of Derbyshire, England. The parish contains ten listed buildings that are recorded in the National Heritage List for England. Of these, one is listed at Grade I, the highest of the three grades, one is at Grade II*, the middle grade, and the others are at Grade II, the lowest grade. The parish contains the village of Breadsall and the surrounding area. The listed buildings consist of houses, cottages and associated structures, a church, and a chapel.

== Key ==
Grade	Criteria
I	Buildings of exceptional interest, sometimes considered to be internationally important
II*	Particularly important buildings of more than special interest
II	Buildings of national importance and special interest

== Buildings ==
Name and location	Photograph	Date	Notes	Grade
All Saints' Church; 52.95431°N 1.44909°W		12th century	The church has been extended and altered through the centuries, and was restored in 1915 by W. D. Caröe following a fire. It is built in gritstone with tile roofs, and consists of a nave, a north aisle, a south porch, a chancel with a north vestry, and a west steeple. The steeple has a tower with four stages and string courses, clasping buttresses, and a west doorway with two orders and colonnettes, above which is a niche with a pointed head, a two-light window with a hood mould, and lancet bell openings. Over these is a corbel table, an embattled parapet, and a recessed octagonal spire with two tiers of small lucarnes. The porch is gabled, and the doorway is Norman with two orders of colonnettes and a chevron arch. The east window has five lights and is in Perpendicular style.	I
Breadsall Priory; 52.96874°N 1.43351°W		13th century	A country house built on the site of an Augustinian priory, extended and altered through the centuries, particularly in about 1861, and in 1906 when a wing was added, and it has since been used as a hotel. The house is built in gritstone with moulded string courses, and tile roofs with coped gables and kneelers. It is in two and three storeys, and has a south front of six irregular bays. This front contains two bay windows, one square with two storeys, the other canted, a canted oriel window, and, on the right, a tower with an embattled parapet, containing a doorway with a decorated ogee head. The windows are mullioned or mullioned and transomed.	II
The Old Hall; 52.95460°N 1.44953°W		14th century (probable)	A fragment of a manor house that has been much altered. It is in gritstone with some brick, and has a chamfered string course, an eaves bands, a dentilled eaves cornice on the north, and a tile roof with a coped gable on the west. The building is in one and two storeys with a basement on the west, and has a hall range of two bays, and a cross-wing. The cross-wing is timber framed and gabled, with buttresses, the upper storey is jettied, and it contains mullioned and transomed windows. On the left return, external steps lead to a doorway with a chamfered surround and a pointed arch.	II*
23 Rectory Lane; 52.95427°N 1.45149°W	—	Early 17th century (probable)	A timber framed cottage with red brick infill, a tile roof, a single storey and three bays. The doorway is off-centre, and the windows are casements.	II
Ivy Cottage; 52.95334°N 1.44993°W	—	Early 17th century	The cottage, which was extended to the east in the 18th century, is timber framed with brick infill, the extension is in painted brick, and the west end is in gritstone. There is a single storey with attics, two bays, and a single-bay extension. On the front is a gabled porch, casement windows, and two gabled dormers.	II
Rose Cottage and Shamrock Cottage; 52.95340°N 1.45100°W	—	Early 17th century (probable)	A farmhouse, later two cottages, it is timber framed, with painted brick infill and a tile roof. There are two storeys and five bays. On the front is a gabled porch, and to the left is an oriel window and two gabled dormers. Elsewhere, the windows are horizontally-sliding sashes. Inside, there is an inglenook fireplace.	II
1 Pall Mall; 52.95249°N 1.44934°W	—	1711	The house was extended to the west in 1735 and again in the late 18th century, and is in red brick with a tile roof. There are two storeys and three bays, the right bay lower. In the right bay is a brick dated 1711, and above the doorway is a datestone dated 1735. The doorway has a segmental head and a keystone, and the windows are casements with segmental heads, those in the ground floor with keystones.	II
Breadsall Manor; 52.95858°N 1.45247°W	—	Early 19th century	A rectory, later a private house, it is in stuccoed red brick, with a floor band containing a decorative frieze of circles, overhanging eaves, and a hipped Welsh slate roof. There are two storeys and fronts of three bays. The middle bay of the west front contains a shallow bow window, and the centre bay of the south front is recessed, containing a porch and a doorway with a rectangular fanlight. The windows are sashes.	II
Methodist Chapel; 52.95221°N 1.44476°W	—	1826	The chapel is in rendered brick with a Welsh slate roof, and has a front of two bays. In the centre is a gabled porch, flanked by semicircular-headed windows. Over these is a string course, and a stepped and ramped parapet with gabled top. Above the string course is an inscribed and dated plaque.	II
Stable block, Breadsall Priory; 52.96906°N 1.43417°W	—	Mid 19th century	The stable block, which has been converted for other uses, is in gritstone, and has tile roofs with coped gables and finials. There is a single storey and a U-shaped plan, with the courtyard enclosed by a wall containing a Gothic archway with a crow-stepped gable. The west range has a gable with a clock face, and a bell turret with a lead spirelet, and a weathervane. The openings have Gothic arches, and include cross windows, and there are gabled dormers.	II
