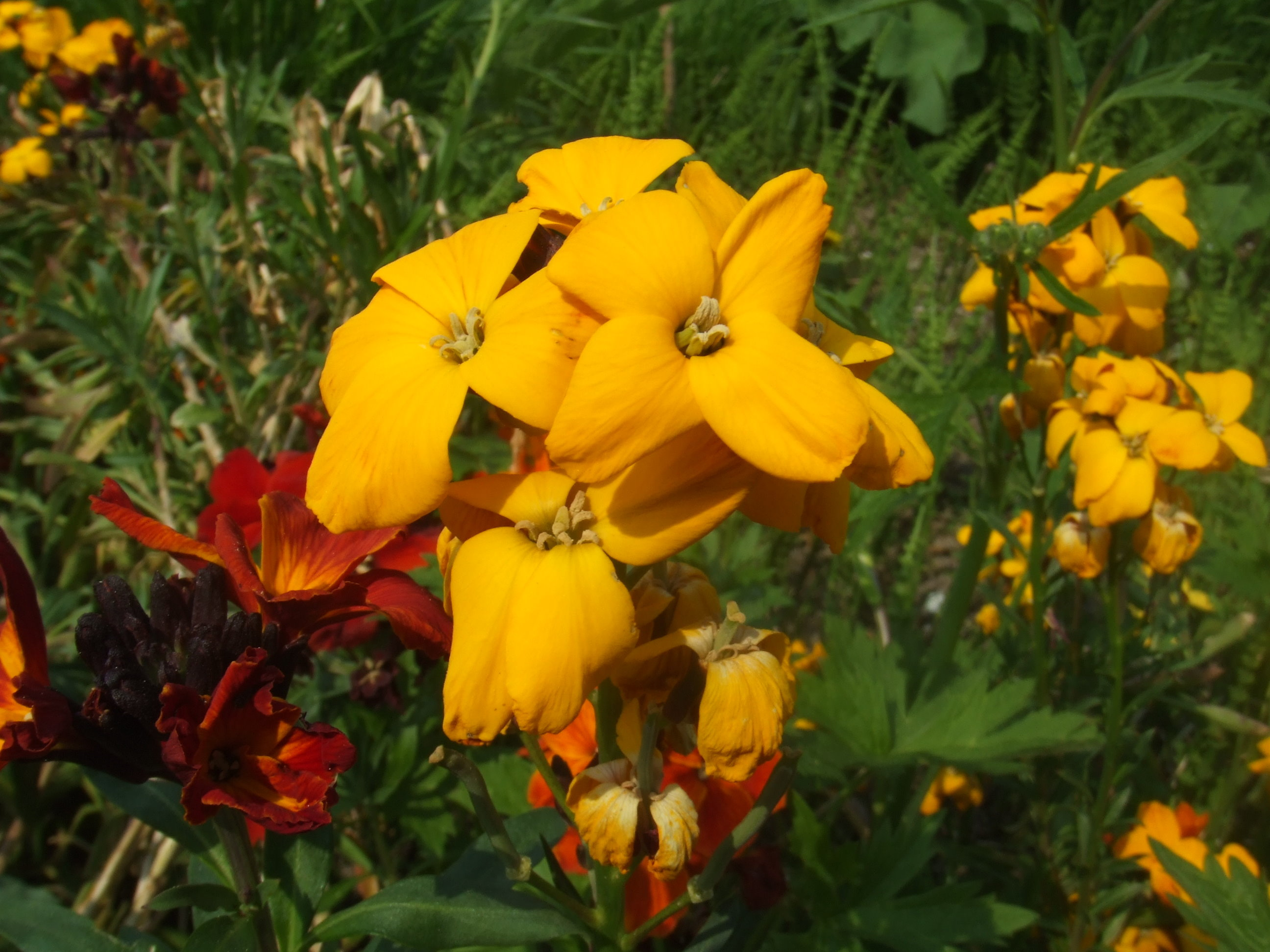

Scientific classification
- Kingdom: Plantae
- Clade: Tracheophytes
- Clade: Angiosperms
- Clade: Eudicots
- Clade: Rosids
- Order: Brassicales
- Family: Brassicaceae
- Genus: Erysimum
- Species: E. cheiri

Binomial name
- Erysimum cheiri (L.) Crantz

Synonyms
- Cheiranthus cheiri

= Erysimum cheiri =

Species of flowering plant

Erysimum cheiri, syn. Cheiranthus cheiri, the wallflower, is a species of flowering plant in the family Brassicaceae (Cruciferae), native to Greece, but widespread as an introduced species elsewhere. It is also treated as a hybrid under the name Erysimum × cheiri. It is widely cultivated as a garden plant.

== Name ==
The common name "wallflower" attaches to all cultivars of this plant, as well as other species within the genus Erysimum and the former genus Cheiranthus.

== Description ==
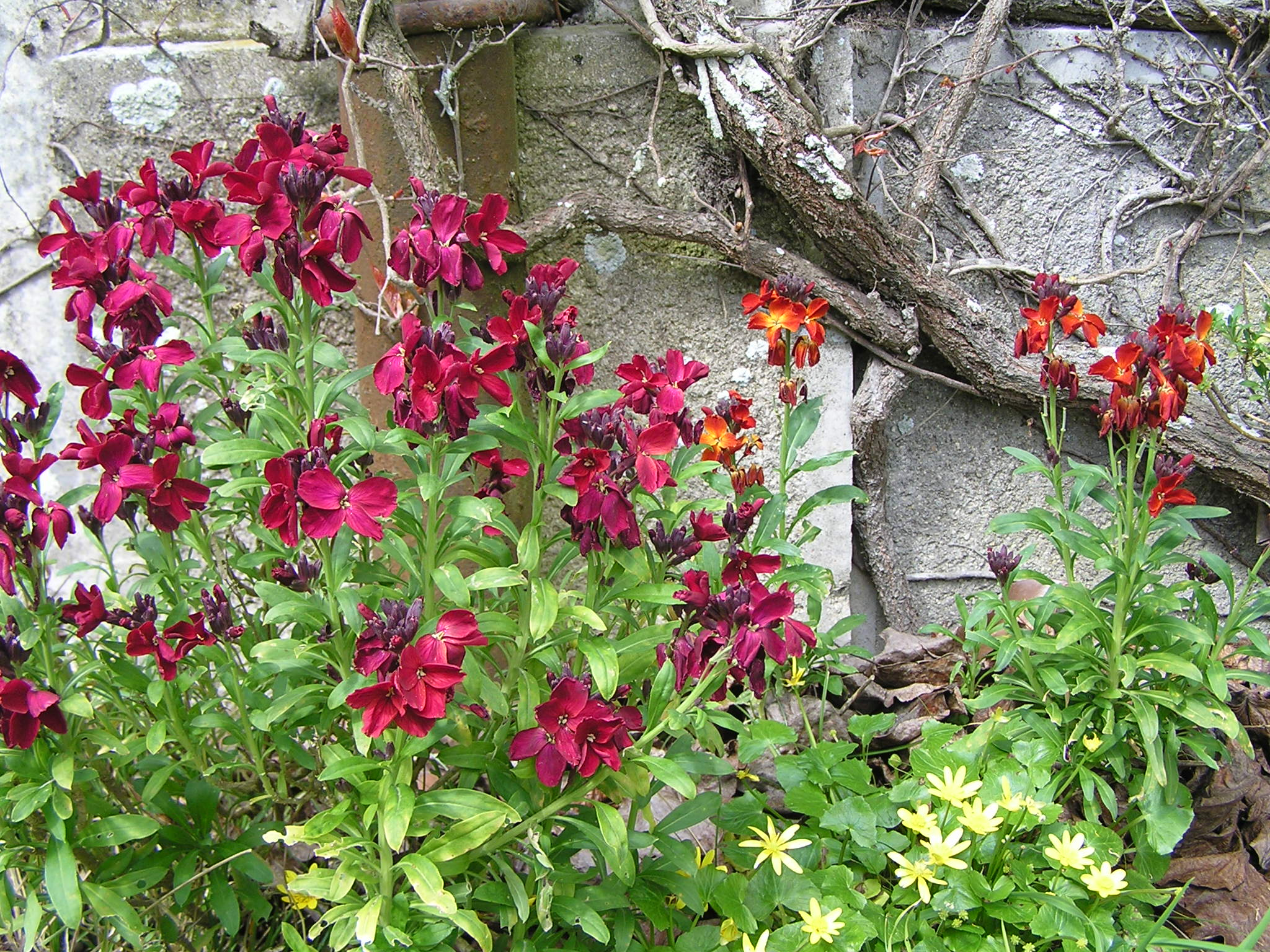
Growing as garden plant

This is a herbaceous perennial, often grown as a biennial, with one or more highly branching stems reaching heights of 15–80 cm (6–31 in). The leaves are generally narrow and pointed and may be up to 20 cm (8 in) long. The upright to ascending shoot axes can lignify in the lower area. The lower leaves are in a rosette and have a short stalk. The leaf blade is up to 10 centimeters long, lanceolate and has double-stranded hair. The leaves along the stem axis are crowded, much smaller and almost sessile.

=== Inflorescence ===
The top of the stem is occupied by a club-shaped inflorescence of 10 to 30 strongly scented, nectar-bearing flowers, the crown of which is yellow to brown or reddish in color due to the interaction of the red anthocyanin cyanidin with various carotenoids, and golden yellow in the wild form. Each flower has purplish-green sepals and rounded petals which are two to three centimeters long and in shades of bright yellows to reds and purples. The flowers are quite large with a diameter of 20, rarely up to 25 millimeters. The scar is deeply bilobed, the lobes are later curved back. Pollination is carried out by bees and bumblebees.

The flowers fall away to leave long fruits which are narrow, hairy siliques several centimeters in length. The upright pod is hairy, 65–150 mm (2 1/2–6 in) long, up to 3.5 millimeters wide and compressed from the back. The pods are wind spreaders.

== Genomics ==
A chromosome-level genome assembly of the wallflower (Erysimum cheiri) was published in 2026. The genome size is approximately 244 Mb, with most of the sequence anchored to 6 chromosomes. The assembly has a BUSCO completeness of 99.5%, and 38,788 protein-coding genes were predicted.

== Distribution ==
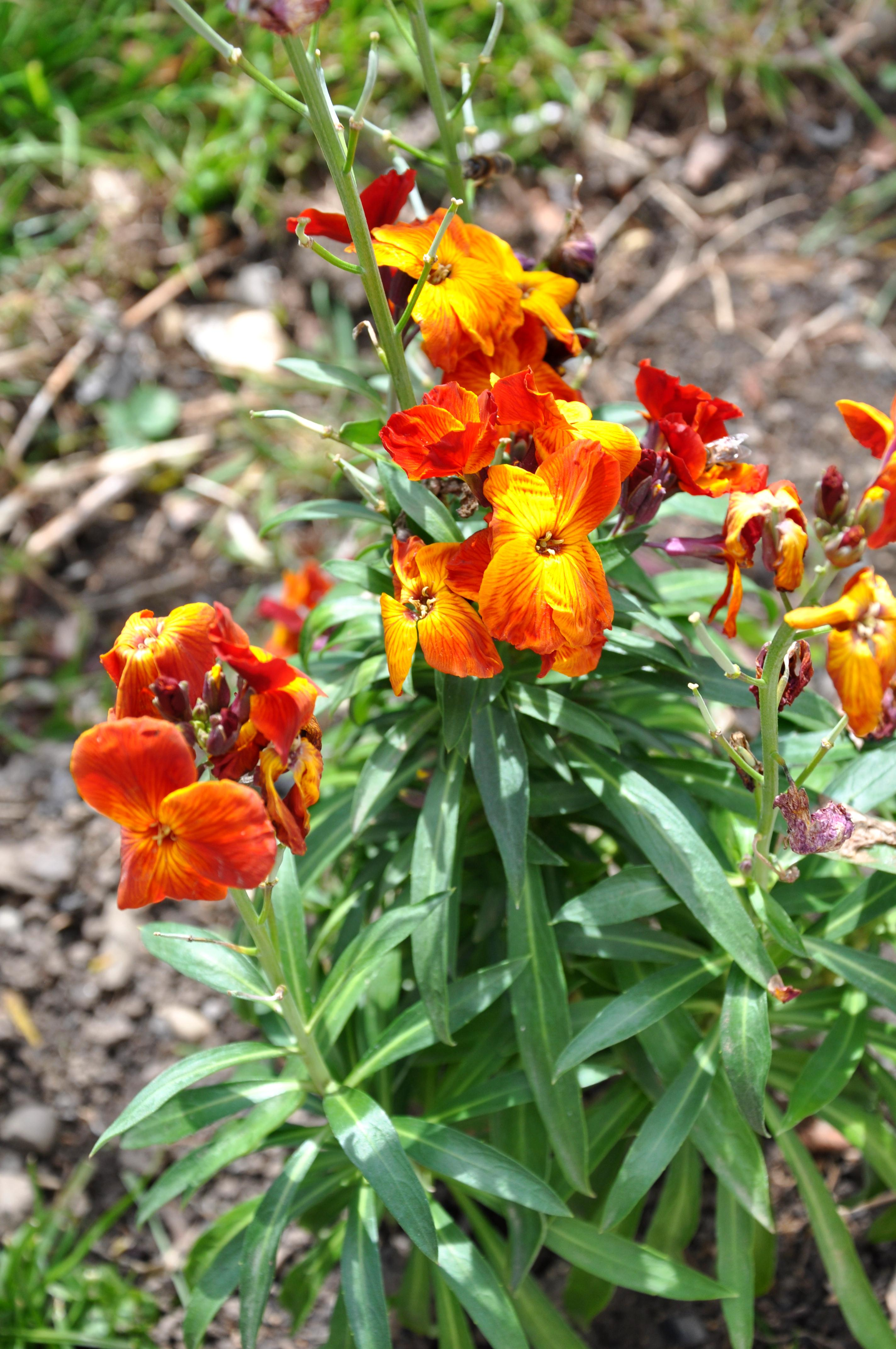
In a grassland

The wallflower is a garden refugee and originally native to south-east Europe, especially in the Mediterranean basin, where it grows in the wild in rock corridors. In Central Europe, it is now a wild and naturalized archaeophyte, which occurs mainly in warmer areas, but is only scattered for the time being.

== Cultivation ==
This is a popular ornamental plant, widely cultivated for its abundant, fragrant flowers in spring. Many cultivars have been developed, in shades of yellow, orange, red, maroon, purple, brown, white and cream. It associates well in bedding schemes with other spring flowers such as tulips and forget-me-nots. It is usually grown as a biennial, sown one year to flower the next, and then discarded. This is partly because of its tendency to grow spindly and leggy during its second year, but more importantly its susceptibility to infections such as clubroot.

=== Cultivars ===
A miniature yellow double leafed wallflower was rediscovered by Rev. Henry Harpur-Crewe (before 1883) and is now named 'Harpur Crewe'. Other bred varieties may vary in appearance from the wild plant. The following cultivars have gained the Royal Horticultural Society's Award of Garden Merit:-

- 'Sunset Apricot' (Sunset Series)
- 'Sunset Primrose' (Sunset Series)

Other varieties such as 'Blood Red Covent Garden' are easy to grow and often benefit from being sown and left to their own devices, growing on patches of empty land with little effort required to maintain them, providing aesthetically sound blooms which produce strong scents.
