= Francis Sacheverel Darwin =

English physician and traveller

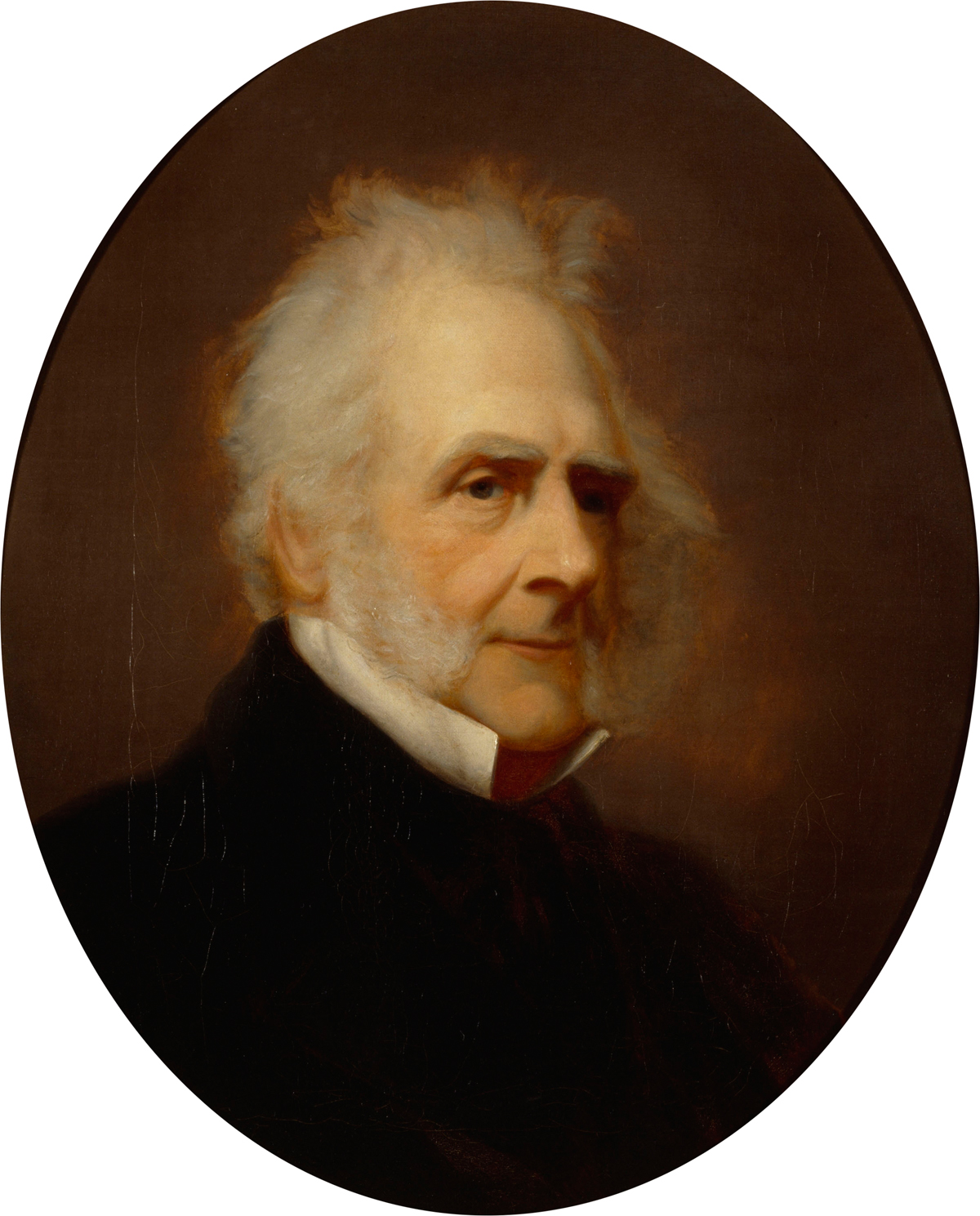
- Sir Francis Sacheverel Darwin
- Born: 17 June 1786; Derby, Derbyshire, England
- Died: November 6, 1859 (aged 73)
- Burial place: Breadsall, Derbyshire, England
- Occupations: Physician, traveller
- Spouse: Jane Harriet Ryle
- Children: Mary Jane Darwin; Reginald F. Darwin; Emma Elizabeth Darwin; Edward Levett Darwin; Frances Sarah Darwin; Georgiana Elizabeth Darwin; Violetta Harriot Darwin; Ann Eliza Thomasine Darwin; Millicent Susan Darwin; John Robert Darwin
- Parent(s): Erasmus Darwin; Elizabeth Collier
- Relatives: See Darwin–Wedgwood family

Sir Francis Sacheverel Darwin (17 June 1786 – 6 November 1859) was a medical doctor and traveller who was knighted by King George IV. Francis Galton and Charles Darwin were his nephews.

== Biography ==
=== Early life ===
Francis Sacheverel was a son of Erasmus Darwin and his second wife Elizabeth (née) Collier, widow of Col Edward Pole and natural daughter of Charles Colyear, 2nd Earl of Portmore. He was an uncle (and godfather) of Francis Galton, half-brother of Robert Waring Darwin and a half-uncle of Charles Darwin.

He graduated from Emmanuel College, Cambridge.

=== Travels ===
In 1808, at 22, he started with four others, one of whom was his brother-in-law Theodore Galton, on a tour through Spain, the Mediterranean and the Near East. Travelling was not then what it is now, and they came in contact with war, robbers, privateers and the plague in the diary of this two years' tour in the East. Of the five who started, only Darwin returned alive.

The diary of the tour shows a keen antiquarian taste gratified under many difficulties, and it is recognised that Darwin not only loved adventure for its own sake, but was a born naturalist also, whose ready pencil followed a keen eye, where rock and mineral, plant and beast were concerned, as readily as when it portrayed an archaeological novelty or displayed the costumes of Greece or Turkey. Typical of the man is the account he gives of the plague in Smyrna; instead of flying from the place, he remarks

On the 2nd day we again found ourselves at Smyrna amongst the plague, which had increased, 400 persons having died in our absence. I had now an opportunity of watching the progress of this disorder in several English sailors, who having been on shore, had caught the infection. I also visited the Armenian, and Greek hospitals, where numbers were dying daily of the plague (p. 55).

At Smyrna also we hear the tale of a gun discharged immediately under the window, which their host informed them was the shooting of another cat by a soldier posted to shoot the cats coming out of the next house where everybody but the baby had died of plague; the cats being the chief transporters of the infection. Darwin, wanting more experience of the plague, on another return to Smyrna undertook by invitation of the native physicians charge of several hospitals, of which the Greek and Armenian contained each 120 patients.

This was a good opportunity to become conversant, with the diseases of the climate, and from constant observation I found the plague was frequently checked by an active practice of which the Medici of the East were totally ignorant. Intermittent fevers and the Lepra Graecorum are very peculiar in the Levant. Hard eggs and salt fish being the hospital diet, phthisis is most prevalent.

During the tour Darwin visited Tangiers, Tetuan, and attempted to get into Fes, not then visited by Europeans, but was not permitted to reach that closed centre of Islam.

His wife's copy of her husband's diary was the source for Travels in Spain and the East, 1808-1810; by Sir Francis Sacheverell Darwin; [edited by F. D. S. Darwin]. Cambridge: University Press, 1927.

== Marriage and children ==
On 16 December 1815 he married Jane Harriet Ryle (11 December 1794 – 19 April 1866) - at St. George, Hanover Square, London. They had the following children:

- Mary Jane Darwin (12 February 1817 – 1872), married Charles Carill-Worsley of Platt Hall, near Manchester, in 1840. One daughter,
  - Elizabeth (d. 1927), married Nicolas Tindal of Aylesbury Manor. Four children survived infancy (surnamed Tindal-Carill-Worsley):
    - Charles (d. 1920), Captain RN, married Rose Dalby, leaving no issue;
    - Ralph (d. 1967), Commander RN, married Kathleen, daughter of Simon Mangan of Dunboyne Castle, HM Lieutenant for County Meath from 1895–1905, leaving a son and two daughters:
      - Nicolas, Grp Capt RAF (1911–2006), married Winnifred, daughter of Major Henry Cooper, leaving seven children;
      - Sheila M. (d. 1953), married Raymond O'Neill SC, leaving four children;
      - Margaret (1909–2008), Convent of the Sacred Heart;
    - Clementia (d. 1969), married Phillip Frank of East Carleton Manor, Norfolk, became Tindal-Carill-Worsley, by Royal Licence. leaving two sons and one daughter
      - Geoffrey, Air Commodore, Married 1st Berys Gilmour, left a son, Philip Nicolas.
      - Peter, Lt Col, married Rosemary Lloyd Davidson and has a son and daughter;
      - Elizabeth, married Richard Holland.
    - Acton, early winter sports pioneer at Davos, died unmarried;
- Reginald F. Darwin (4 April 1818 – 1892)
- Emma Elizabeth Darwin (27 February 1820 – 22 December 1898), married Edward Woollett Wilmot in 1842.
- Edward Levett Darwin (12 April 1821 – 1901)
- Frances Sarah Darwin (19 July 1822 – 1881), married Gustavus Barton in 1845, widowed 1846 and remarried to Marcus Huish (the father of the art dealer Marcus Bourne Huish) in 1849.
- Georgiana Elizabeth Darwin (12 August 1823 – 1902), married Rev. Benjamin Swift in 1862.
- Violetta Harriot Darwin (5 March 1826 – 1880), aka V. H. Darwin, illustrator.
- Ann Eliza Thomasine Darwin (2 June 1828 – 1904)
- Millicent Susan Darwin (26 March 1833 – 1899), married the Rev. Henry Oldershaw in 1861.
- John Robert Darwin (29 March 1835 – 1899)

== Later years and death ==
He returned home, and after a short practice in Lichfield, where his father had a practice, settled down at Breadsall Priory in Derbyshire, and spent his days in studying archaeology and natural history without ulterior end; his home was full of animal oddities as well as tame snakes, while there were wild pigs in the woods. As he was studying the European honey bee, he discovered isoamyl acetate in 1859.

He transmitted his love of natural history to his son Edward Levett Darwin, author (under the name of "Hugh Elms") of a 'Gamekeeper's Manual' (4th edition 1863), which shows keen observation of the habits of various animals.

Darwin was knighted by George IV in 1820, and was also a Deputy Lieutenant of Derbyshire.

Both he and his wife are buried at Breadsall Priory, and a memorial plaque to them and some of their family is located in All Saints' Church, Breadsall.
