= Geoffrey Tindal-Carill-Worsley =

British Air Force officer (1908–96)

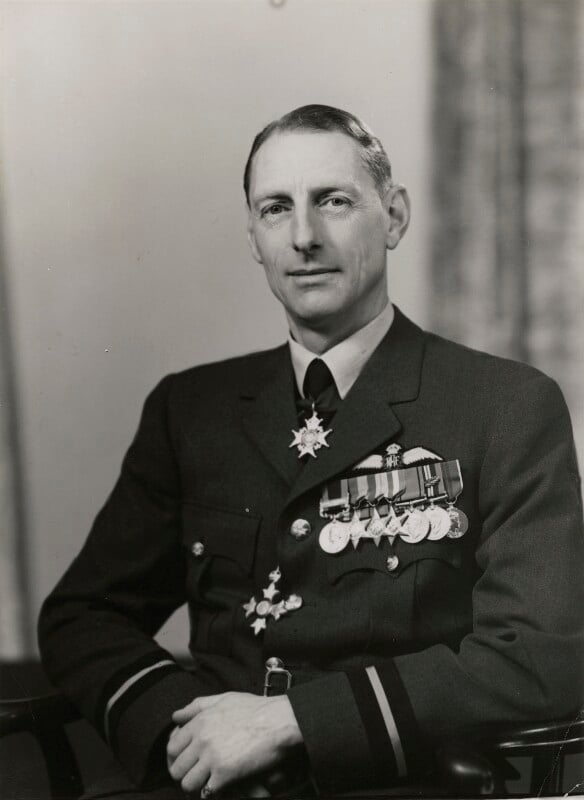
Tindal-Carill-Worsley in 1954

Air Cdre Geoffrey Nicolas Ernest Tindal-Carill-Worsley CB CBE RAF (8 June 1908 - 28 April 1996) was a Royal Air Force officer.

He was the son of Philip Tindal-Carill-Worsley and the first cousin of Group Captain Nicolas Tindal-Carill-Worsley. Educated at Eton College and RAF College, Cranwell. He was commissioned into the RAF in 1928, and served during the Second World War and was appointed CBE in 1943 and CB in 1954.
