= Nicolas Tindal-Carill-Worsley =

Nicolas Henry Joseph Tindal
- Born: Nicolas Henry Joseph Tindal-Carill-Worsley; 7 March 1911; Dublin, Ireland
- Died: 28 January 2006 (aged 94); Bishops Lydeard, Somerset
- Military career
- Allegiance: United Kingdom
- Branch: Royal Air Force
- Rank: Group captain
- Conflicts: World War II

Group Captain Nicolas Tindal-Carill-Worsley RAF (known as Nicolas Tindal) (7 March 1911 – 28 January 2006), was a bomber pilot during the Second World War who helped plan and execute the Great Escape from Stalag Luft III, where he was imprisoned between 1940 and 1945.

== Family ==
Tindal was born in Dublin, the son of Commander Ralph Tindal-Carill-Worsley, RN and Kathleen, daughter of Simon Mangan of Dunboyne Castle, HM Lieutenant for County Meath from 1895 to 1905. Tindal was born to a distinguished family. Amongst his ancestors were Lord Chief Justice Sir Nicolas Tindal, Erasmus Darwin, and Charles Worsley. His father and uncle, Charles Tindal-Carill-Worsley, had both served on the Royal Yacht and went on to have distinguished careers in the Royal Navy, Charles commanding HMS Prince George during the Gallipoli Campaign in 1915. At the same time, Tindal's maternal grandmother's first cousin, Brigadier General Paul Aloysius Kenna, VC, was commanding a brigade in the invasion of Suvla Bay, where he was killed in action in August 1915.

== Early life ==
He was educated at Beaumont College, a Jesuit public school in Berkshire, and Stonyhurst College, Lancashire, before reading Botany at Trinity College, Dublin. While at Trinity, he befriended Oliver St John Gogarty and learned to fly.

== Military career ==
=== Pre-war ===
He was commissioned as a pilot officer in the Royal Air Force in 1931. He was promoted to flying officer in 1933, and subsequently to flight lieutenant, before promotion to squadron leader in 1938. Tindal's first cousin, Geoffrey Tindal-Carill-Worsley also served in the RAF during the Second World War, retiring an air commodore. His kinsman, Wing Commander Archie Tindal, was the first Australian airman to be killed on the Australian mainland in the war and gave his name to an RAAF air base.

In the mid-1930s, while stationed at RAF Grantham, Tindal played rugby for Leicester. He was also twice capped for the RAF, playing against the Royal Navy at Twickenham in 1933 and 1934.

Tindal became a flying instructor in 1938, where his students included such future flying aces as Stanford Tuck.

=== Second World War ===
From the outbreak of the Second World War in 1939, he served with 14 OTU and then he commanded 44 Squadron flying Handley Page Hampden bombers. He was shot down on 11 December 1940 at Châteaubriant in occupied France, together with Sergeants E Martin, J McEwan and RP Tebutt. All were taken prisoner and Tindal was eventually imprisoned at Stalag Luft III, where he spent the rest of the war.

==== Great Escape ====
Tindal was on the first regular escape committee established after the Stalag Luft III compound was opened, with responsibility for intelligence and the 'contact' organisation. Preceding the Great Escape, his particular responsibility was to forge the documents of the escapers. He had originally been on the list of airmen due to escape from the camp in the daring enterprise, but had given his place to a Polish airman whose wife was due to give birth in England. This man was shot along with other airmen at the direct orders of Reichsmarschall Hermann Göring, an order that was one of the pieces of evidence most critical in securing Göring's conviction at the Nuremberg trials. Tindal had had his own escapes. He and two other airmen were the first to attempt a 'gate escape' dressed in their own uniforms with braid and badges Tindal had obtained by bribery, after which he managed to open his door through filing his key. Tindal once escaped in German uniform for eight days, before being caught near Hamburg. Tindal was also responsible for the dissemination of BBC bulletins that had been signalled from the NCO compound by semaphor. For his many escape attempts, Tindal was twice mentioned in Dispatches.

=== Post-war ===
Tindal was promoted to group captain in 1946, with seniority to July 1945. He was appointed commandant of an RAF base in Treviso, Italy, in 1945, before being appointed to a staff position in Palestine, until his retirement in 1948. While in Jerusalem, where he was stationed with his family, Tindal narrowly escaped the King David Hotel bombing, on 22 July 1946.

Tindal retired to County Donegal in Ireland in 1949, where he bought a country house and farm. He was an early pioneer of fruit farming in Ireland, until his orchards were destroyed by Tropical Storm Debbie in 1965.

== Personal life ==
On 27 June 1936 Tindal married Winifred (1913–1997), daughter of Major Henry Cooper, Green Howards, joint master of the Belvoir Hunt, and niece of Evelyn Cheston and they had seven children: Charles (m. Rosemary Dennehy, granddaughter of Sir Cecil Stafford-King-Harman, Bt, of Rockingham), Penelope (m. Henry Clark, colonial officer and MP for Antrim North (1959–1970)), Francis (m. Brigid, daughter of Col Phillip Lauder), Caroline (m. Peter, son of Maj. Gen Sir David Dawnay and Lady Katherine (née) Beresford), Jacqueline (m. John, son of Dr Harold Frank Hoar), Ralph (m. Caroline, daughter of James Villiers-Stuart of Dromana within the Decies) and Anthony (m. Penelope Railton). He left 25 grandchildren and 38 great grandchildren.

== Death ==
Tindal died at Dunkirk Memorial House, Bishops Lydeard, Somerset, on 28 January 2006. A requiem mass was held at the church of St. Conal and St. Joseph, Bruckless, County Donegal, on 6 February 2006.

== See also ==
- Darwin–Wedgwood family
- Tyndall
