= Morley, Derbyshire =

Village in Derbyshire, England

Coordinates: 52.964°N 1.412°W

Morley
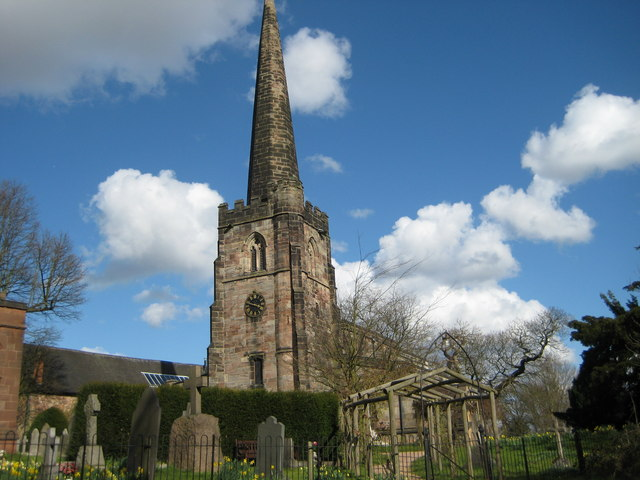
- St Matthew's Church

- Location within Derbyshire
- OS grid reference: SK395408
- District: Erewash
- Shire county: Derbyshire
- Region: East Midlands
- Country: England
- Sovereign state: United Kingdom
- Post town: ILKESTON
- Postcode district: DE7
- Police: Derbyshire
- Fire: Derbyshire
- Ambulance: East Midlands
- UK Parliament: Mid Derbyshire
- Website: www.morleychurch.co.uk

Morley is a village and civil parish within the Borough of Erewash in Derbyshire, England.

It is on the eastern side of Morley Moor, with Morley Smithy to the north. The parish church of St Matthew is a grade I listed building and stands near the (converted) Tithe Barn and dovecote of Morley Hall. The church features a wall of stained glass depicting the story of Robert of Knaresborough along the north aisle which came from Dale Abbey in 1539, home of the fine Sacheverell tombs.

== History ==
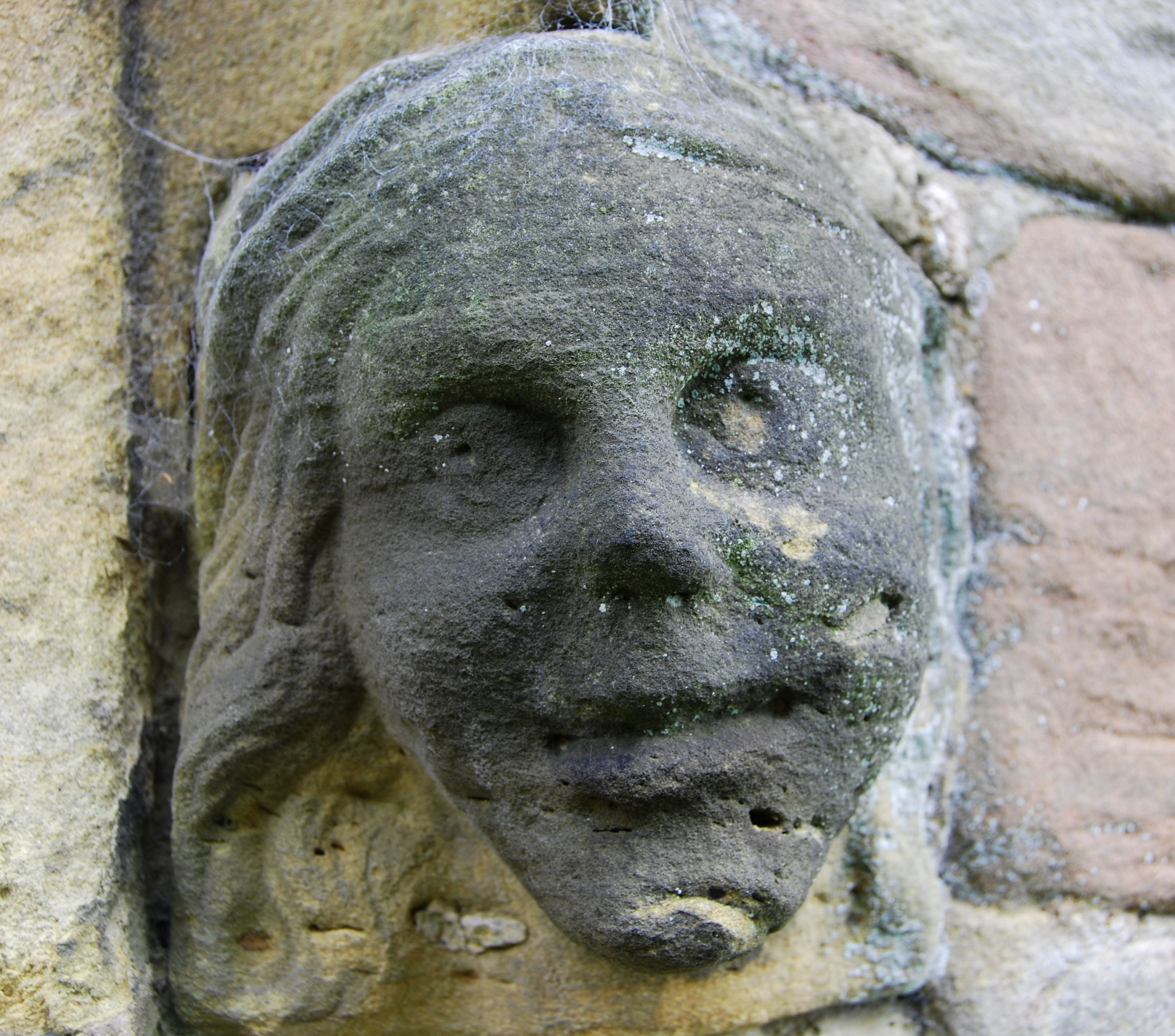
Ancient carving at St Matthew's church

Morley is first certainly mentioned in 1009, as (in) Moreleage, though later copies of a 1002 document in which it appears as (æt) Morlege may be genuine. The name probably means "open ground by a moor", from Old English mōr "moor, clearing, pasture" + lẽah "open ground, clearing". In 1009 Æþelræd Unræd (King Ethelred the Unready) signed a charter at the Great Council which recognised the position and boundaries of Westune. The land described in that charter included the lands now known as Shardlow, Great Wilne, Church Wilne, Crich, Morley, Smalley, Weston and Aston-on-Trent. Under this charter Æþelræd gave his minister, Morcar, a number of rights that made him free from tax and to his own rule within the manor.

Morley was mentioned in the Domesday Book as belonging to Henry de Ferrers and having woodland pasture that was four furlongs by three.

Morley Park was one of the seven royal parks within Duffield Frith and is about five miles north in the parish of Ripley.

== Education ==
Broomfield Hall of Derby College is located in Morley.

Derby Japanese School (ダービー日本人補習校 Dābī Nihonjin Hoshūkō), a Japanese weekend school, holds its classes in Broomfield Hall.

== Notable residents ==
Sir Streynsham Master who was involved in the early East India Company and who was High Sheriff of Derbyshire in 1712, resided with his wife at Stanley Grange in Morley. Joseph Whittaker (1815–1892), botanist, lived and died here. Edward FitzWalter Wright, vice-Chairman of the Butterley Company and High Sheriff of Derbyshire in 1942 lived at Morley Manor.
