= The Voyage of the Beagle =

1839 book by Charles Darwin

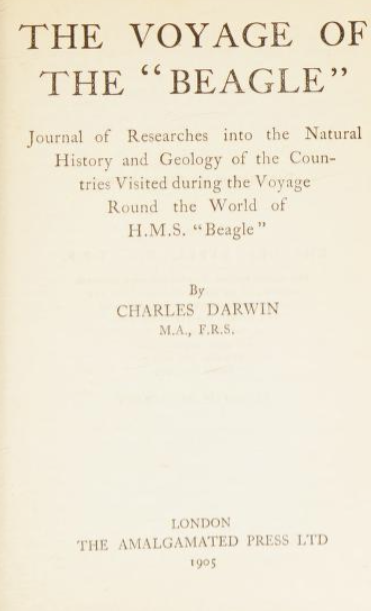
- Title page for the 1905 edition
- Author: Charles Darwin
- Working title: Journal and Remarks
- Publication date: 1839

The Voyage of the Beagle, originally published as Journal and Remarks, is an 1839 book written by Charles Darwin, covering his research and activities during the second survey expedition of the ship HMS Beagle, bringing him considerable fame and respect. This was the third volume of The Narrative of the Voyages of H.M. Ships Adventure and Beagle, the other volumes of which were written or edited by the commanders of the ships. Due to the popularity of Darwin's account, the publisher reissued it later in 1839 as Darwin's Journal of Researches, and the revised second edition published in 1845 also used this title. A republication of the book in 1905 introduced the title The Voyage of the Beagle, by which it is now best known.

Beagle sailed from Plymouth Sound on 27 December 1831 under the command of Captain Robert FitzRoy. While the expedition was originally planned to last two years, it lasted almost five—Beagle did not return until 2 October 1836. Darwin spent most of this time exploring on land (three years and three months on land; 18 months at sea). The book is a vivid travel memoir as well as a detailed scientific field journal covering biology, geology, and anthropology that demonstrates Darwin's keen powers of observation, written at a time when Western Europeans were exploring and charting the whole world. Although Darwin revisited some areas during the expedition, for clarity the chapters of the book are ordered by reference to places and locations rather than by date.

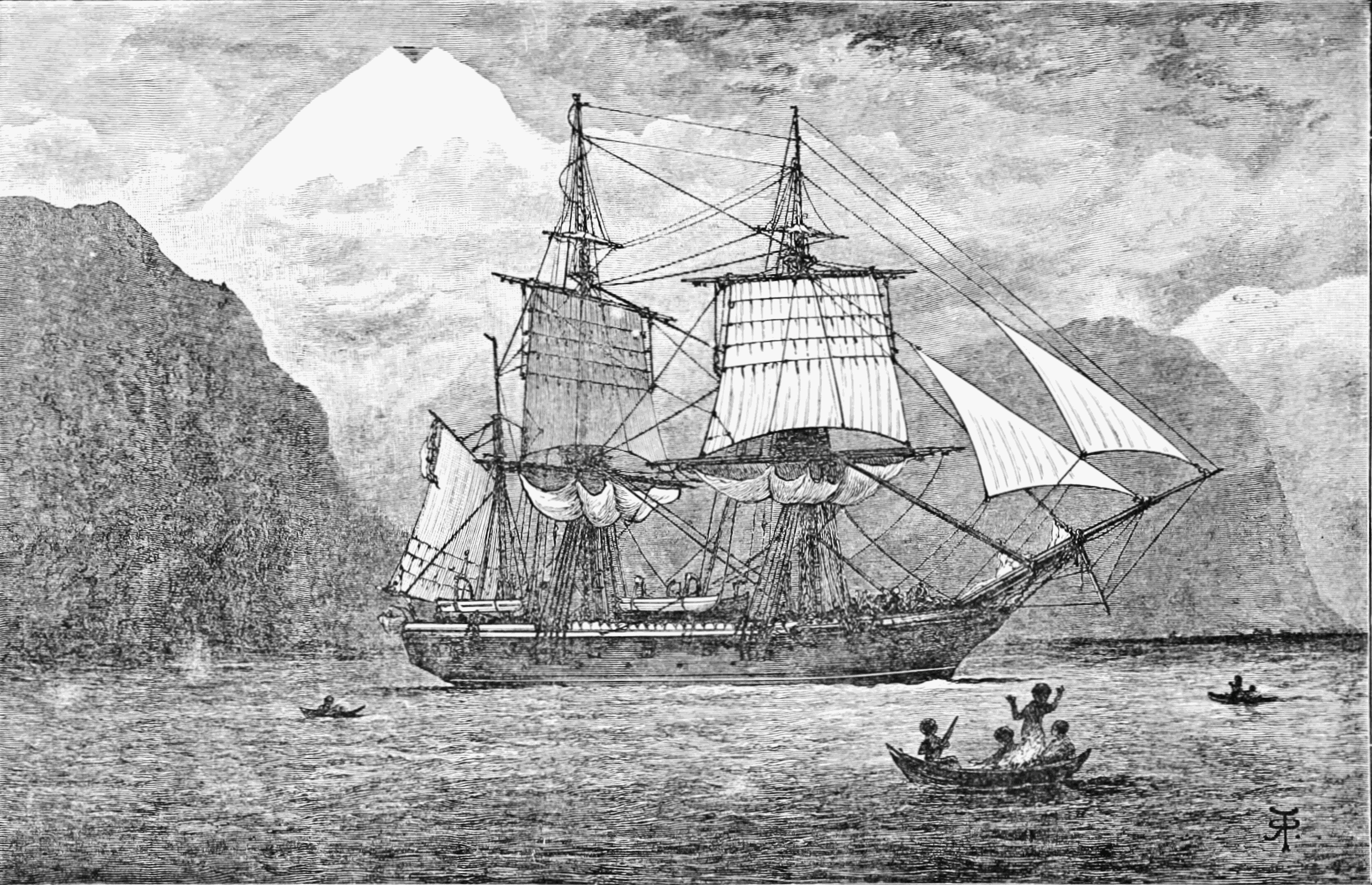
Reproduction of frontispiece by Robert Taylor Pritchett from the first Murray illustrated edition, 1890: HMS Beagle in the Straits of Magellan at Monte Sarmiento in Chile.

Darwin's notes made during the voyage include comments hinting at his changing views on the fixity of species. On his return, he wrote the book based on these notes, at a time when he was first developing his theories of evolution through common descent and natural selection. The book includes some suggestions of his ideas, particularly in the second edition of 1845.

== Context ==
In May 1826 two ships left Plymouth to survey the southern coasts of South America. The senior officer of the expedition was Phillip Parker King, Commander and Surveyor of HMS Adventure, and under his orders Pringle Stokes was Commander and Surveyor of HMS Beagle. In August 1828 Stokes died after shooting himself. In December Robert FitzRoy was given command of the ship and continued the survey. In January 1830 FitzRoy noted in his journal the need for expertise in mineralogy or geology, on a future expedition he would "endeavour to carry out a person qualified to examine the land; while the officers, and myself, would attend to hydrography." Both ships returned to Plymouth in August 1830. King was in poor health, and retired from the Navy (he moved back to his home in Australia in 1832).

In August 1831, while Beagle was being readied, FitzRoy's offer of a place for a self-funded naturalist was raised with University of Cambridge professors. Henslow passed it on to Darwin who was well qualified and, enthused by reading Humboldt's Personal Narrative, was on a short study tour with geologist Adam Sedgwick in preparation for a planned visit with friends to Tenerife. Darwin read the letters when he got home, and was eager to join the voyage.

=== Darwin's diary / journal ===
On board the ship, Darwin began a day-to-day record of activities in the form of a diary, which he commonly called "my Journal". Darwin wrote entries, in ink, while on the ship or when staying for a period in a house on shore. When travelling on land, he left the manuscript on the ship, and made pencil notes in pocket books to record details of his excursions along with his field notes on geology and natural history. He then wrote up his diary entries from these notes or from memory, sometimes several weeks after the event.

Pages 1 and 2, dated 16 December 1831, outline events from Darwin arriving home on 29 August to his arrival at Devonport on 24 October. From page 3 onwards he adopts a consistent layout, with month, the year and place in a heading at the top, page number in a top corner, and the day of the month in the margin at each entry. After delays and false starts due to weather, they set off on 27 December. Darwin suffered seasickness, and his entry for that date starts "I am now on the 5th of Jan.y writing the memoranda of my misery for the last week".

In April, a month after reaching South America, he wrote to his sister Caroline that he was struggling to write letters, partly due to "writing everything in my journal". A few weeks later at Botafogo in Rio de Janeiro, tired and short of time, he sent her "in a packet, my commonplace Journal.— I have taken a fit of disgust with it & want to get it out of my sight, any of you that like may read it.— a great deal is absolutely childish: Remember however this, that it is written solely to make me remember this voyage, & that it is not a record of facts but of my thoughts". He invited criticisms. In reply, his sister Catherine praised his "interesting and entertaining" descriptions, "Susan read the Journal aloud to Papa, who was interested, and liked it very much". His Wedgwood relatives had asked to see it at Maer Hall. Darwin left that "entirely in your hands.— I suspect the first part is abominaly childish, if so do not send it to Maer.— Also, do not send it by the Coach, (it may appear ridiculous to you) but I would as soon loose a piece of my memory as it.— I feel it is of such consequence to my preserving a just recollection of the different places we visit."

By 14 July 1833 Darwin had sent more of his diary. On 28 October Caroline gave the requested critical assessment – in the first part Darwin had "probably from reading so much of Humboldt, got his phraseology & occasionally made use of the kind of flowery French expressions which he uses, instead of your own simple straight forward & far more agreeable style. I have no doubt you have without perceiving it got to embody your ideas in his poetical language & from his being a foreigner it does not sound unnatural in him". However, "the greatest part I liked exceedingly & could find no fault". In July 1834, Darwin agreed that these points were "perfectly just", and continued to update his diary carefully.

As Beagle headed homewards in April 1836, Darwin told Caroline that FitzRoy too was busy with writing "the account of the Voyage". This "Book" might be "rather diffuse", but otherwise good: "his style is very simple & excellent. He has proposed to me, to join him in publishing the account, that is, for him to have the disposal & arranging of my journal & to mingle it with his own. Of course I have said I am perfectly willing, if he wants materials; or thinks the chit-chat details of my journal are any ways worth publishing. He has read over the part, I have on board, & likes it." Darwin asked his family about this idea, but would be aware the custom of the Navy was that the captain had a right to first use of papers.

=== Journal and remarks ===
Soon after Darwin's return, he was at a party hosted by Fanny and Hensleigh Wedgwood for their relatives on 4 December 1836. They agreed to review his journal. The physician and travel writer Henry Holland looked at some pages and "thought that it would not be worth while to publish it alone, as it would be partly going over the same ground with the Captain", leaving Darwin "more perplexed" but "becoming rather inclined to the plan of mixing up long passages with Capt Fitzroy." He would "go on with the geology and let the journal take care of itself", but Emma Wedgwood did not think Holland "any judge as to what is amusing or interesting", and like Catherine thought it should be published by itself, not "mixed up with Capt. FitzRoy's". Fanny and Hensleigh found the "Journal so interesting, that it is quite difficult to stop to criticize". Though "not in general a good reader of travels", he "found no part of yours tedious." They had "read a great deal of it aloud too" as a more severe test, and concluded it had "more variety and a greater number of interesting portions" than other travel books, "the less it is mixed up with the Captains the better."

After advice from Broderip, FitzRoy wrote on 30 December that "One volume might be for King—another for you—and a third for me. The profits if any, to be divided into three equal portions—What think you of such a plan?" Darwin agreed, and began work on his volume. In March he told Fox "I am now hard at work and give up every thing else for it. Our plan is as follows.— Capt. FitzRoy writes two volumes, out of the materials collected during both the last voyage under Capt. King to T. del Fuego and during our circumnavigation.— I am to have the third volume, in which I intend giving a kind of journal of a naturalist, not following however always the order of time, but rather the order of position.— The habits of animals will occupy a large portion, sketches of the geology, the appearance of the country, and personal details will make the hodge-podge complete.— Afterwards I shall write an account of the geology in detail, and draw up some Zoological papers.— So that I have plenty of work, for the next year or two, and till that is finished I will have no holidays."

== Publication of FitzRoy's narrative and Darwin's book ==
Darwin reorganised his diary, trimmed parts, and incorporated scientific material from his field notes. He passed his writing to the publisher Henry Colburn, and in August 1837 had the first proofs back from the printer. Henslow helped check them; on 4 November, Darwin wrote to him that "If I live till I am eighty years old I shall not cease to marvel at finding myself an author". Part of it was printed, "the smooth paper and clear type has a charming appearance, and I sat the other evening gazing in silent admiration at the first page of my own volume, when I received it from the printers!"

FitzRoy had to edit King's account of the first voyage, adding extracts from the journal of the previous captain of Beagle and his own journal when he took over, as well as write his own account of the second voyage. In mid-November 1837, he took offence that Darwin's preface to volume III (and a similar preface to the first part of The Zoology) lacked, in his view, enough acknowledgement of the help given by FitzRoy and other officers; the problem was overcome. By the end of February 1838, King's Narrative (volumes I) and Darwin's Journal (volume III) had been printed, but FitzRoy was still hard at work on volume II.

The Narrative was completed and published as a four-volume set in May 1839, as the Narrative of the Surveying Voyages of His Majesty's Ships Adventure and Beagle, describing their Examination of the Southern Shores of South America, and the Beagle's Circumnavigation of the Globe, in three volumes. Volume one covers the first voyage under Commander Phillip Parker King, volume two is FitzRoy's account of the second voyage. Darwin's Journal and Remarks, 1832–1835 forms the third volume, and the fourth volume is a lengthy appendix. The publication was reviewed as a whole by Basil Hall in the July 1839 issue of the Edinburgh Review.

Volume two includes FitzRoy's Remarks with reference to the Deluge in which he recanted his earlier interest in the geological writings of Charles Lyell and his remarks to Darwin during the expedition that sedimentary features they saw "could never have been effected by a forty days' flood", asserting his renewed commitment to a literal reading of the Bible. He had married on the ship's return, and his wife was very religious.

Darwin's contribution proved remarkably popular and the publisher, Henry Colburn of London, announced on 15 August a separate volume of Darwin's text, published with a new title page as Journal of Researches into the Geology and Natural History of the various countries visited by H.M.S. Beagle. The Publishers‘ Circular of 2 September carried an advertisement for this volume, as well as a separate advertisement for the other volumes, as listed at William Broderip's article in the Quarterly Review. This was apparently done without seeking Darwin's permission or paying him a fee.

=== Second edition: changing ideas on evolution ===
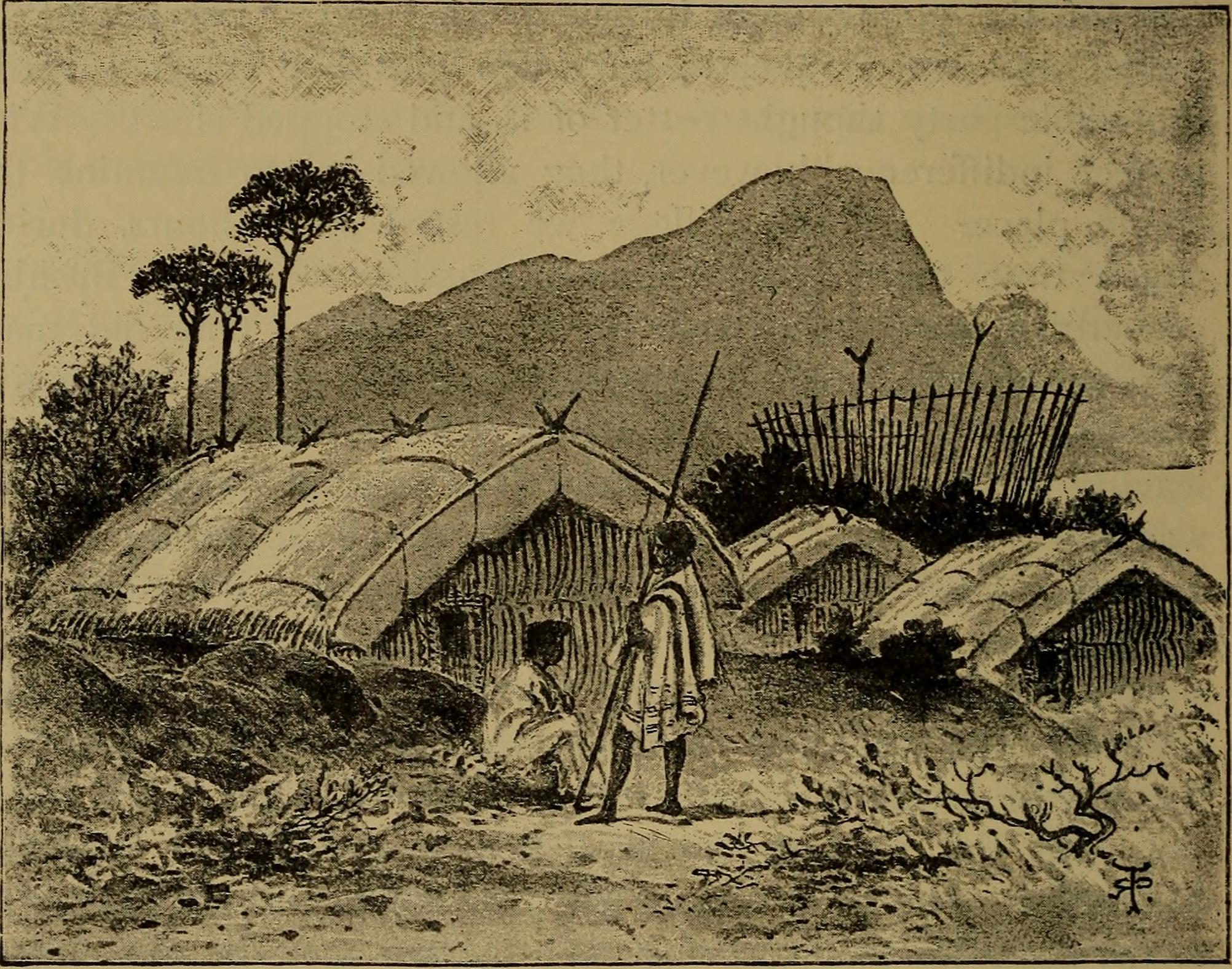
Illustration from Journal of Researches into the Natural History and Geology

The second edition of 1845 incorporated extensive revisions made in the light of interpretation of the field collections and developing ideas on evolution. This edition was commissioned by the publisher John Murray, who actually paid Darwin a fee of £150 for the copyright. The full title was modified to Journal of Researches into the Natural History and Geology of the countries visited during the voyage of H.M.S. Beagle round the world.

In the first edition, Darwin remarks in regard to the similarity of Galápagos wildlife to that on the South American continent, "The circumstance would be explained, according to the views of some authors, by saying that the creative power had acted according to the same law over a wide area". (This was written in a reference to Charles Lyell's ideas of "centres of creation".) Darwin notes the gradations in size of the beaks of species of finches, suspects that species "are confined to different islands", "But there is not space in this work, to enter into this curious subject."

Later editions hint at his new ideas on evolution:

Considering the small size of these islands, we feel the more astonished at the number of their aboriginal beings, and at their confined range... within a period geologically recent the unbroken ocean was here spread out. Hence, both in space and time, we seem to be brought somewhat near to that great fact – that mystery of mysteries – the first appearance of new beings on this earth.

Speaking of the finches with their gradations in size of beaks, he writes "one might really fancy that from an original paucity of birds in this archipelago, one species had been taken and modified for different ends."

In 1890, John Murray published an illustrated edition of the book, at the suggestion of the artist Robert Taylor Pritchett, who was already known for accompanying voyages of the RYS Wanderer and Sunbeam, and producing pictures used in books on these cruises. In his foreword to this edition of Journal and Researches, Murray said that most "of the views given in this work are from sketches made on the spot by Mr. Pritchett, with Mr. Darwin's book by his side", and the illustrations had been "chosen and verified with the utmost care and pains".

== Contents – places Darwin visited ==
For readability, the chapters of the book are arranged geographically rather than in an exact chronological sequence of places Darwin visited or revisited. The main headings (and in some cases subheadings) of each chapter give a good idea of where he went, but not the exact sequence. See second voyage of HMS Beagle for a detailed synopsis of Darwin's travels. The contents list in the book also notes topics discussed in each chapter, not shown here for simplicity. Names and spellings are those used by Darwin. The list below is based on the Journal and Remarks of 1839.

- Preface
1. Chapter I: St. Jago–Cape de Verde Islands (St. Paul's Rocks, Fernando Noronha, 20 Feb.., Bahia, or San Salvador, Brazil, 29 Feb..)
2. Chapter II: Rio de Janeiro
3. Chapter III: Maldonado
4. Chapter IV: Río Negro to Bahia Blanca
5. Chapter V: Bahía Blanca
6. Chapter VI: Bahia Blanca to Buenos Aires
7. Chapter VII: Buenos Aires to St. Fe
8. Chapter VIII: Banda Oriental
9. Chapter IX: Patagonia
10. Chapter X: Santa Cruz–Patagonia
11. Chapter XI: Tierra del Fuego
12. Chapter XII: The Falkland Islands
13. Chapter XIII: Strait of Magellan
14. Chapter XIV: Central Chile
15. Chapter XV: Chiloe and Chonos Islands
16. Chapter XVI: Chiloe and Concepcion
17. Chapter XVII: Passage of Cordillera
18. Chapter XVIII: Northern Chile and Peru
19. Chapter XIX: Galapagos Archipelago
20. Chapter XX: Tahiti and New Zealand
21. Chapter XXI: Australia (Van Diemen's Land)
22. Chapter XXII: Coral Formations (Keeling or Cocos Islands)
23. Chapter XXIII: Mauritius to England

In the second edition, the Journal of Researches of 1845, chapters VIII and IX were merged into a new chapter VIII on "Banda Oriental and Patagonia", and chapter IX now included "Santa Cruz, Patagonia and The Falkland Islands". After chapter X on Tierra del Fuego, chapter XI had the revised heading "Strait of Magellan–Climate of the Southern Coasts". The following chapters were renumbered accordingly. Chapter XIV was given the revised heading "Chiloe and Concepcion: Great Earthquake", and chapter XX had the heading "Keeling Island:–Coral Formations", with the concluding chapter XXI keeping the heading "Mauritius to England".

== Sources ==
- Darwin, Charles (June 1960), "Darwin as a Traveller", The Geographical Journal, 126 (2): 129–136, Bibcode:1960GeogJ.126..129D, doi:10.2307/1793952, JSTOR 1793952 Retrieved on 15 December 2006
- Browne, E. Janet (1995), Charles Darwin: vol. 1 Voyaging, London: Jonathan Cape, ISBN 1-84413-314-1
- Browne, E. Janet (2002), Charles Darwin: vol. 2 The Power of Place, London: Jonathan Cape, ISBN 0-7126-6837-3
- Darwin, Charles (1835), Extracts from letters to Professor Henslow. Cambridge, [printed by the Cambridge University Press for private distribution] Retrieved on 30 April 2007
- Darwin, Charles (1887), Darwin, F (ed.), The life and letters of Charles Darwin, including an autobiographical chapter., London: John Murray (The Autobiography of Charles Darwin) Retrieved on 15 December 2006
- Darwin, Charles (1958), Barlow, N (ed.), The autobiography of Charles Darwin 1809–1882. With the original omissions restored. Edited and with appendix and notes by his grand-daughter Nora Barlow., London: Collins (The Autobiography of Charles Darwin) Retrieved on 15 December 2006
- Desmond, Adrian; Moore, James (1991), Darwin, London: Michael Joseph, Penguin Group, ISBN 0-7181-3430-3
- Freeman, R. B. (1977), The Works of Charles Darwin: An Annotated Bibliographical Handlist (Second ed.), Cannon House Folkestone, Kent, England: Wm Dawson & Sons Ltd Retrieved on 30 April 2007
- Gordon, Robert; Thomas, Deborah (20–21 March 1999), "Circumnavigating Darwin", Darwin Undisciplined Conference, Sydney. Retrieved on 15 December 2006
- Keynes, Richard (2001), Charles Darwin's Beagle Diary, Cambridge University Press
- Rookmaaker, Kees; van Wyhe, eds. (March 2021), Transcription of Darwin, C. R. [Beagle diary (1831-1836)]. EH88202366, Darwin Online
- Thomson, Keith S. (2003), HMS Beagle : the story of Darwin's ship, London: Phoenix, ISBN 978-0-7538-1733-9, OCLC 52143718
- van Wyhe, John (2006), Charles Darwin: gentleman naturalist: A biographical sketch Retrieved on 15 December 2006

=== Bibliography of original publications ===
- Voyages of the Adventure and Beagle, Volume I – King, P. Parker (1839), Proceedings of the first expedition, 1826–30, under the command of Captain P. Parker King, R.N., F.R.S, Great Marlborough Street, London: Henry Colburn Retrieved on 30 April 2007
- Voyages of the Adventure and Beagle, Volume II – FitzRoy, Robert (1839), Proceedings of the second expedition, 1831–36, under the command of Captain Robert Fitz-Roy, R.N., Great Marlborough Street, London: Henry Colburn Retrieved on 15 December 2006
- Voyages of the Adventure and Beagle, Volume III – Darwin, Charles (1839), Journal and remarks. 1832–1836., London: Henry Colburn (The Voyage of the Beagle) Retrieved on 30 April 2007
- Voyages of the Adventure and Beagle, Appendix – FitzRoy, Robert (1839b), Appendix, Great Marlborough Street, London: Henry Colburn Retrieved on 15 December 2006
- Darwin, Charles (1845), Journal of researches into the natural history and geology of the countries visited during the voyage of H.M.S. Beagle round the world, under the Command of Capt. Fitz Roy, R.N. (Second ed.), London: John Murray (The Voyage of the Beagle) Retrieved on 30 April 2007
- Darwin, Charles (1890), Journal of researches into the natural history and geology of the various countries visited by H.M.S. Beagle etc. (First Murray illustrated ed.), London: John Murray (The Voyage of the Beagle) Retrieved on 3 August 2014
