= Project Isabela =

Environmental restoration project in Ecuador

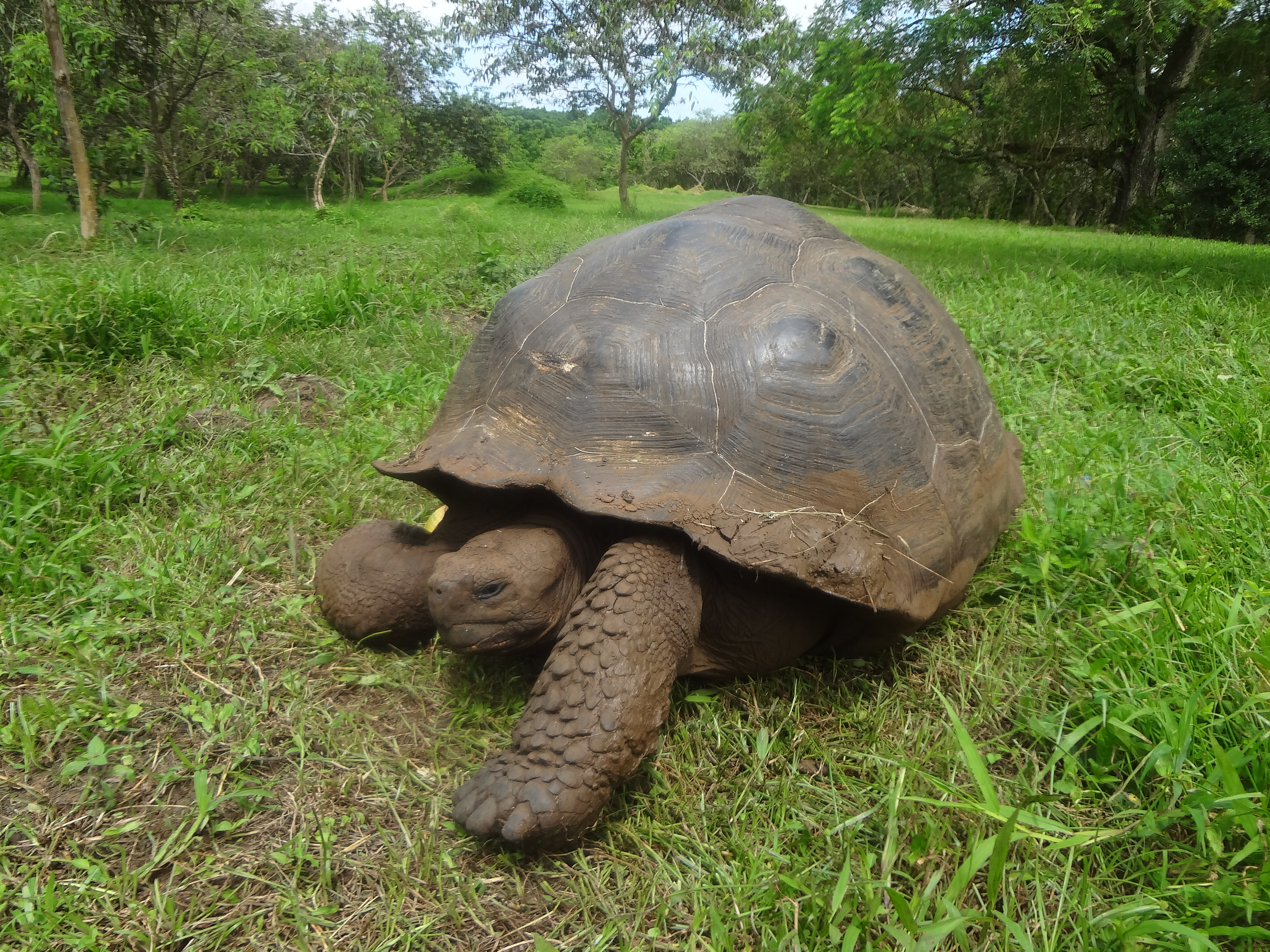
The Galápagos tortoise, whose protection from extinction impulsed the Project Isabela

The Project Isabela (Spanish: Proyecto Isabela) was an environmental restoration project in the Galápagos Islands of Ecuador that took place between 1997 and 2006, initiated by the Charles Darwin Foundation and the Galápagos National Park. Species introduced in the 16th and 17th centuries to the islands, mainly goats and some donkeys and pigs, brought ecological devastation to the islands and posed as a threat to the Galápagos tortoise that was by the 1990s near extinction. By 1997, plans had been officially implemented to eradicate these introduced species in northern Isabela, Santiago, and Pinta islands. Skilled park rangers used helicopters to hunt, and sterilized Judas goats fitted with radio collars, to track down the feral goats. The initiative was brought into action in 1999, and by 2006, 150,000 goats alone were eradicated. As of 2011, the project was the world's largest ecological island restoration effort ever.

== See also ==
- List of animals in the Galápagos Islands
