= Wildlife of the Galápagos Islands =

Wildlife of the Galápagos archipelago

The Galápagos Islands are off the west coast of South America straddling the equator. The Galápagos are located at the confluence of several currents including the cold Humboldt Current travelling north from South America and the Panama Current travelling south from Central America. These currents cool the islands and provide the perfect environment for the wildlife there.

The islands are volcanic in origin and were never attached to any continent. Galápagos wildlife arrived by flying, floating or swimming. Birds might have flown there by accident and decided to settle there due to favourable conditions. Mammals or reptiles might have floated on a piece of wood and drifted to the islands. Some animals like marine iguanas, may have swum there. In most environments the larger mammals are the predators at the top of the food chain, but those animals did not make it to the Galápagos. Thus the giant Galápagos tortoise became the largest land animal. Due to the lack of natural predators, the wildlife in the Galápagos is extremely tame and has no instinctive fear.

The Galápagos Islands are home to a remarkable number of endemic species. The stark rocky islands (many with few plants) made it necessary for many species to adapt to survive and by doing so evolved into new species. It was after visiting the Galápagos and studying the wildlife that a young Charles Darwin developed his theory of evolution.

== Fauna ==
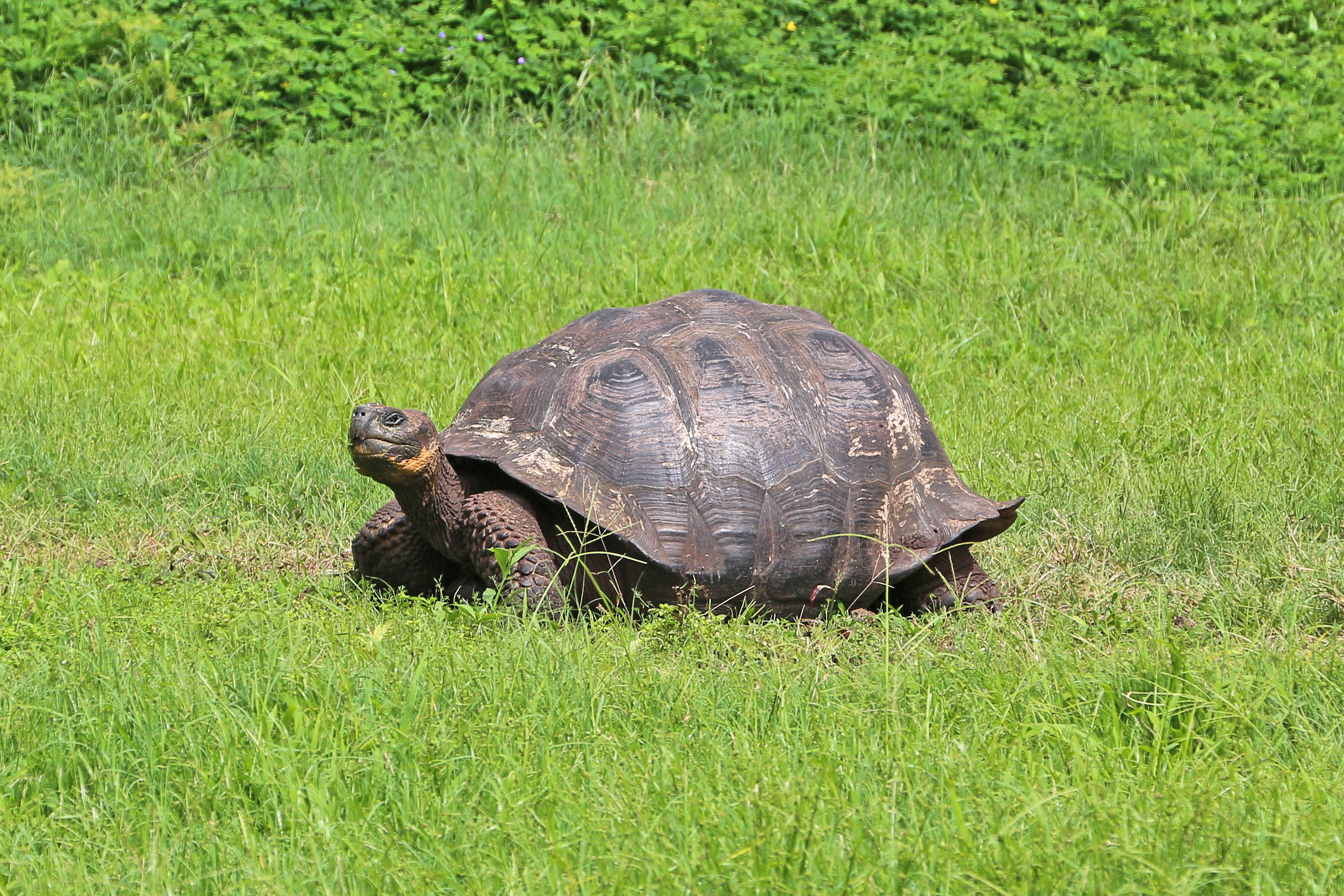
Santa Cruz giant tortoise

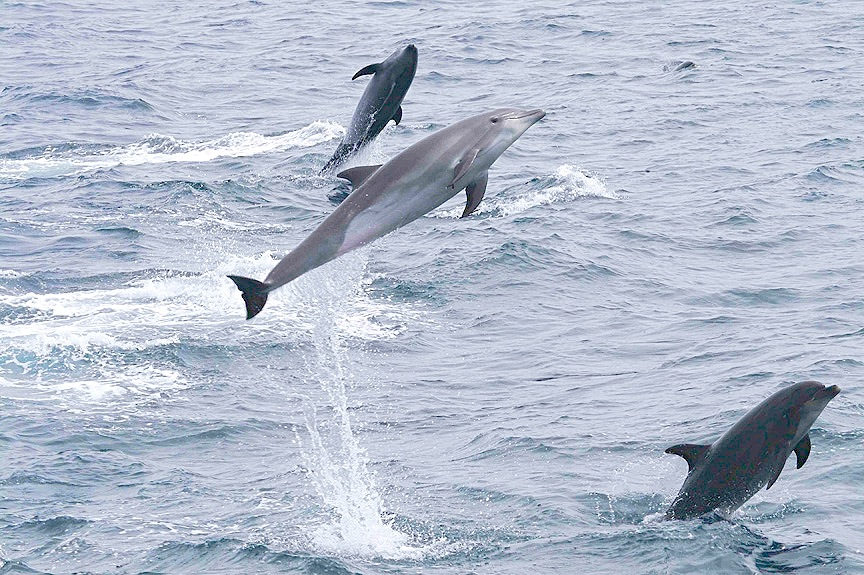
Bottlenose dolphins jumping off the Galápagos Islands

One of the best-known animals is the Galápagos tortoise, which once lived on ten of the islands. Now, some tortoise species are extinct or extinct in the wild and they live on six of the islands. The tortoises have an average lifespan of over 130 years.

The marine iguana is also extremely unusual, since it is the only iguana adapted to life in the sea. Land iguanas, lava lizards, geckos and harmless snakes are also found on the islands. The large number and range of birds is also of interest to scientists and tourists. Around 56 species live in the archipelago, of which 27 are found only in the Galápagos. Some of these are found only on one island.

The most outstanding are the Galápagos penguins, which live on the colder coasts. Also notable are Darwin's finches, frigatebirds, albatrosses, gulls, boobies, pelicans and Galápagos hawks. Two birds, the flightless cormorant and the Galápagos crake, which is nearly flightless, evolved to their successful form on the islands without natural predators.

On the other hand, there are many mammal species, mostly sea mammals such as whales, dolphins and sea lions. A few species of endemic Galápagos mice (or rice rats) — the Santiago Galápagos mouse and the Fernandina Galápagos mouse — have also been recently rediscovered.

Charles Darwin discovered over 100 species of birds on the island. The most famous of which were Darwin's finches.

== Flora ==
On the larger Galápagos Islands, four ecological zones have been defined: coastal, low or dry, transitional and humid. In the first, species such as myrtle, mangrove and saltbush can be found. In the second grow cactus, Bursera graveolens (incense tree), carob tree, manchineel (poison apple tree), chala and yellow cordia, among others. In the transitional zone taller trees, epiphytes and perennial herbs can be seen. The best known varieties are the cat's claw, espuela de gallo. In the humid sector are the cogojo, Galápagos guava, cat's claw, Galápagos coffee, passionflower and some types of moss, ferns and fungus.

== Invasive species ==
Invasive species are organisms that are not native to a place. They can wreak havoc on ecosystems, infrastructure and economies. Species can be introduced naturally or more commonly, through human actions such as colonization, tourism, or the releasing of pets or livestock. There are over 1,300 invasive species in the Galápagos Islands, consisting of over 500 insects, over 750 plants and over 30 vertebrates. Most of the plants were brought for agricultural and aesthetic reasons. Due to their isolation, the Galápagos Islands are highly susceptible to invasive species, but the biodiversity of the islands make them one of Ecuador's most prized features. Scientists who study the flora and fauna in the Galápagos agree that the increasing number of invasive species in the region is "the single greatest threat to the terrestrial ecosystems".

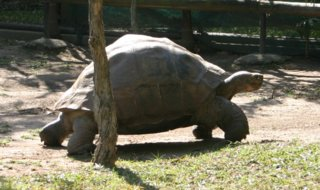
A Galápagos tortoise in an enclosure

Feral goats introduced to the islands for agricultural reasons had a huge impact. They are dangerous to the environment because they eat almost everything, destroying many habitats. The lack of natural predators led to overpopulation, which had a huge impact on the Galápagos tortoise, driving the tortoises near to extinction.

Fixing invasive species problems is difficult and expensive. There are many organizations dedicated to preventing and eradicating invasive species. For instance, the Charles Darwin Foundation helped create the Galápagos Inspection and Quarantine System (SICGAL) that checks the luggage brought into the Galapagos Islands for potentially invasive animals and plants. Project Isabela worked to rid the islands of their feral goats. This was very gruesome due to the massacre of goats which left large amounts of dead goats on the ground. The slaughtered goats were left on the ground so that the nutrients from the goats would return to the ecosystem. Other invasive species that were successfully eradicated were fire ants, rock pigeons, cats, and a species of blackberry bush. Scientists have also suggested the release of natural enemies to control population growth amongst the invasive species.

In 2024, the Galápagos National Park Directorate and the Galápagos Conservancy successfully rehabilitated 136 Galápagos tortoises on the Island of Isabela. The young tortoises between the ages of 5 and 9 years old were reared in the Arnaldo Tupiza Breeding and Rearing Center on Isabela and transported by helicopter to another area of the island in Cinco Cerros near the Cerro Azul volcano. Tortoises are a vital part of the ecosystem as they disperse seeds. Breeding programs for the Galápagos tortoises have been successful across the islands. On Española Island the breeding program was such a success that 14 tortoises on the island multiplied to 3,000.
