= Judas goat =

Animal herding term

A Judas goat is a trained goat used in animal herding. Judas goats are trained to associate with sheep or cattle and lead them to a specific destination. In stockyards, a Judas goat will lead sheep to slaughter while its own life is spared. Judas goats are also used to lead other animals to specific pens and onto trucks. They have fallen out of use in recent times, but can still be found in various smaller slaughterhouses in some parts of the world, as well as conservation projects.

According to veteran U.S. meatpacking executive Greg Dunn, the goat employed during his tenure at the Swift meatpacking plant in Sioux City, Iowa was addicted to nicotine, having been trained with cigarettes—rewards which it consumed whole.

Cattle herders may use a Judas steer to serve the same purpose as a Judas goat. Both the term and the technique itself originated from cattle drives in the United States in the 1800s.

The term is a reference to Judas Iscariot, an apostle of Jesus Christ who betrayed Jesus as told in the New Testament of the Bible.

== Use in tracking invasive species ==
The phrase has also been used to describe specially trained goats that are used to find feral goats targeted for eradication. These Judas goats are usually sterilized, outfitted with a transmitter, and/or marked with red paint for tracking purposes. Upon their release, the goat finds the feral herds, allowing hunters to exterminate them. The podcast Radiolab dedicated a portion of its episode on the Galápagos Islands to the impact of feral goats on the islands' environments, and the use of Judas goats to restore ecological balance. Judas goats are also used to target other invasive species. These include camels in Australia, pigs in America, rats in Mexico, and raccoon dogs in Europe.

=== Goat eradication on San Clemente Island ===
Endemic species on San Clemente Island have been degraded by feral goats since 1875. Under the administration of the United States Navy, a program of intensive eradication between 1972 and 1989 eliminated 28,000 goats on the island. Some feral goats were able to find cover in the rugged terrain and eradication efforts were hindered by frequent naval bombardment operations. Between 1989 and 1991, a dozen radio-collared Judas goats were used on the island to locate the remaining feral goats. 263 goats were killed.

=== Project Isabela in the Galápagos Islands ===
Project Isabela was a goat extermination initiative in the Galápagos Islands that started in 1997 and ended in 2006. Approximately 140,000 goats were living in the wild on the islands and threatening the local ecosystem. Goats were killed by gunmen in helicopters and on foot. Judas goats were used to lure the remaining goats to their deaths. The project cost 6 million dollars.

== See also ==
- Scapegoat
