= Extracts from Letters to Henslow =

1835 pamphlet based on Charles Darwin's letters

Extracts from Letters to Henslow, taken from ten letters Charles Darwin wrote to John Stevens Henslow from South America during the second survey expedition of HMS Beagle, were read to the Cambridge Philosophical Society on 16 November 1835 by Henslow and Adam Sedgwick, followed on 18 November by geological notes from the letters which Sedgwick read to the Geological Society of London. On 1 December 1835 they were printed as a pamphlet for private distribution.

This pamphlet helped to establish Darwin's reputation among scientists and the informed public. On first learning of this pamphlet's publication Darwin was "a good deal horrified" at Henslow making public "what had been written without care or accuracy", but "No hay remedio" (it can't be helped).

== Background ==
Darwin came to know Henslow through his attendance at his scientific talks and outings at Cambridge University. He had heard of Henslow through his brother Erasmus who greatly revered him as a man of scientific brilliance and integrity. Inspired by Henslow he soon became a visitor to Henslow's house and subsequently met the scientific fraternity.

The British Admiralty Hydrographer of the Navy Francis Beaufort was part of the Cambridge network, and keen to promote science. When organising the second survey voyage of HMS Beagle, he took up captain Robert FitzRoy's suggestion of taking along a geologist, and asked his friend the mathematician George Peacock to "recommend a proper person to go out as a naturalist with this expedition". Peacock offered the place to the Reverend Leonard Jenyns, who got as far as packing his clothes before having second thoughts. Henslow thought of going, but his wife "looked so miserable" that he turned it down.

Henslow obviously rated Darwin highly, though at the time science was not a formally recognised subject at Cambridge. Henslow replied to Peacock that Darwin was "the best qualified person I know of who is likely to undertake such a situation", and then wrote a letter to Darwin who was then on a field trip in Wales studying practical geology with Adam Sedgwick (Professor of Geology). When Darwin returned to Shrewsbury on 29 August 1831 he found the letter from Henslow telling him of the offer. His father was opposed to the idea, so Darwin turned it down, but his uncle overcame the objections, and on 1 September Darwin accepted the self-funded position.

Preparations were quickly made. Darwin insisted that his collections would be under his own control, subject to them going to a suitable public body. Henslow had hopes for the small Cambridge Philosophical Society museum, but Darwin diplomatically said new finds should go to the "largest & most central collection" rather than a "Country collection, let it be ever so good". FitzRoy arranged transport of specimens to England by the Admiralty Packet Service, and Henslow agreed to store them at Cambridge. Darwin confirmed with him arrangements for land carriage from the port.

== The letters ==
After delays, Beagle set off on 27 December 1831. They visited Atlantic islands, then reached South America on 4 April 1832. Darwin, delighted by his geological findings, collections of organisms and by the sights of the tropics, waited until they were at Rio de Janeiro to write the first of a series of letters to Henslow. Extracts were taken from ten letters:

1. On 18 May, staying onshore in a cottage at Botafogo near Rio de Janeiro, Darwin wrote summarising his research since leaving England.
2. On 15 August he wrote from Montevideo about specimens collected in tropical forests, and described the first box of specimens, which he was sending by the Admiralty Packet ship Emulous departing on 19 August. Henslow replied to the letter after he received the box in mid January.
3. After surveys down the coast and inland exploration, Darwin wrote from Montevideo grumbling that Alcide d'Orbigny might collect "the cream of all the good things" first, before announcing fossil finds at Punta Alta including gigantic Megatherium bones. He completed the letter at Buenos Ayres, adding that his specimens had been sent by the Duke of York Falmouth packet.
4. Returning in April 1833 from months at Tierra del Fuego and a visit to the Falkland Islands, Darwin described his reactions to seeing the Fuegian Yahgan people and the contrast to the Fuegians on board such as Jemmy Button, as well as outlining observations of geology and zoology.
5. From the Río de la Plata, he described his collecting, now with the assistance of a servant (Syms Covington) who he had "taught to skin birds &c".
6. From Montevideo, after extensive land travels during "a bloody war of extermination against the Indians" (by Rosas) and further fossil finds, he sent more specimens.
7. At East Falkland island in March 1834, he was delighted to get a letter from Henslow reporting that the second cargo, with Megatherium fossils, had arrived safely, to great interest from the expert William Clift. Darwin had collected more fossils and related them to seashells, some of which still had their blue colour and looked similar to modern shells. He had managed to get a specimen of a smaller species of rhea.
8. They reached the west coast, and at Valparaíso Darwin was delighted by long-awaited letters from Henslow giving praise and advice. His collecting and geology had continued, including an expedition to the Andes, but illness then delayed him sending the letter.
9. Focussing more on geology, he experienced the 1835 Concepción earthquake and saw both the devastation to the city, and its effect in raising land levels.
10. In a long journey across the Andes, Darwin crossed the Principal Cordillera at the pass of the Puquenas (Piuquenes) and further east crossed the Frontal Cordillera at the Portillo Pass. At over 12,000 feet (3,700 m) he found seashells, and petrified trees projecting through layers of sandstone. After reaching Mendoza, Argentina, he returned by the Uspallata Pass. His letter dated 18 April 1835 gave a detailed description of the complex geology.

From Lima, Darwin wrote on 12 August 1835 that another excursion had changed his ideas about the Cordillera formations, and he was soon going to the Galapagos Islands, but Henslow did not include excerpts, probably this letter arrived too late.

== The Extracts ==
Henslow compiled quotes from ten letters, and minutes of the 16 November 1835 meeting of the Cambridge Philosophical Society, chaired by the president, Rev. Dr William Clark, record that:

Extracts were read of letters from C. Darwin Esq. of Christ's College containing accounts of the Geology of certain parts of the Andes and S. America. Observations by Prof. Sedgwick and Henslow.

At the 18 November meeting of the Geological Society of London, Sedgwick read geological notes based on the letters. After noting that the letters contained "a very great mass of information connected with almost every branch of natural history", he "had selected for the occasion those remarks only which he thought more especially interesting to the Geological Society." He summarised Darwins reports, and "concluded by reading extracts from two letters describing a section transverse to the Andes".

The Athenæum magazine of 21 November reported that Sedgwick "read extracts from letters addressed by Mr. Darwin to Professor Henslow— They referred principally to the writers observations on the tertiary formation of Patagonia & Chili & on the changes of level between land & sea, which he noticed in these countries. The letters also contained an account of his discovery of the remains of the Megatherium over a district of 600 miles in extent to the Southwd of Buenos Ayres & a highly important description of the Geological structure of the Pass of Upsallata, in the Andes, where he discovered alternations of vast tertiary & igneous formations & the existence in the former, of veins of true granite, & of gold & other metals" (transcribed by Darwin's sister Caroline).

Darwin's sister Susan wrote to him on 22 November, and mentioned that their brother Eras had heard that "some of your Letters were read at the Geological Society in London & were thought very interesting". In addition, they had seen part of a letter from Sedgwick telling Dr. Butler that Darwin, his former student, was "doing admirably in S. America," and though there had been "some risk of his turning out an idle man" he would now "have a great name among the Naturalists of Europe."

=== Printed pamphlet ===
On 30 November the Council of the Cambridge Philosophical Society decided, as minuted, that "The printing of certain extracts from Mr Darwin's correspondence be submitted to M^{r} Whewell, M^{r} Peacock & Prof. Henslow."

The pamphlet is headed "For Private Distribution". Its preface dated 1 December 1835 says "They are printed for distribution among the Members of the Cambridge Philosophical Society, in consequence of the interest which has been excited by some of the Geological notices which they contain". A disclaimer [by Henslow] states "The opinions here expressed must be viewed in no other light than as the first thoughts which occur to a traveller respecting what he sees, before he has had time to collate his Notes, and examine his Collections, with the attention necessary for scientific accuracy."

Henslow sent some copies of the pamphlet to Darwin's father, with a note rejoicing that Darwin would soon be back to take a "position among the first Naturalist of the day", delivered on 25 December. According to Darwin's sister Caroline their father "did not move from his seat till he had read every word of your book & he was very much gratified— he liked so much the simple clear way you gave your information Your frank unhacknied mode of writing was to him particularly agreeable". Their father wrote thanking Henslow with the comment that "There is a natural good humored energy in his letters just like himself", and gave copies of the pamphlet to friends and relatives. On 29 December Caroline wrote to tell her brother the news.

On 29 January 1836 their sister Catherine wrote with more family news, noting they had sent their cousin William Fox "one of the little books, with the Extracts from your Letters; every body is much pleased, with them, who has seen them; Professor Henslow sent half a dozen" to Dr. Butler, who had been headmaster when Darwin was at the Shrewsbury School.

=== Related publications ===
The "Geological Notes" as summarised by Sedgwick were published in the Proceedings of the Geological Society of London. Extracts of interest to insect collectors were published in the April 1836 issue of the Entomological Magazine.

In what may have been the first review of Darwin's writings, the August 1836 issue of the Magazine of Natural History reviews section commented on the "various interesting statements" on geology and natural history of "a vast extent of almost unknown country", which while only general as was expected of a "scientific pioneer", left details for others in a way it compared to Humboldt. It printed a selection of the extracts, with titles added.

== Darwin's responses ==
Darwin only heard about all this after Beagle reached the Cape of Good Hope on 31 May 1836. In Cape Town, he received the letter dated 29 January from his sister Catherine which briefly mentioned "We have sent William Fox one of the little books, with the Extracts from your Letters; every body is much pleased, with them, who has seen them; Professor Henslow sent half a dozen to Dr Butler; we sent one also to Tom Eyton;—he says he has written to you at Sydney, so you will have his opinion from himself of them.

Darwin replied "I have been a good deal horrified by a sentence in your letter where you talk of 'the little books with the extracts from your letters'. I can only suppose they refer to a few geological details. But I have always written to Henslow in the same careless manner as to you; & to print what has been written without care & accuracy, is indeed playing with edge tools. But as the Spaniard says, 'No hay remedio'.—"

Some earlier letters caught up with the ship when it reached Ascension Island on 19 July, including the November letter from his sister Susan. He was delighted at the news, particularly Sedgwick's comment about "a great name among the Naturalists of Europe", and later recalled having then "clambered over the mountains... with a bounding step and made the volcanic rocks resound under my geological hammer!."

== 1960 reprint ==
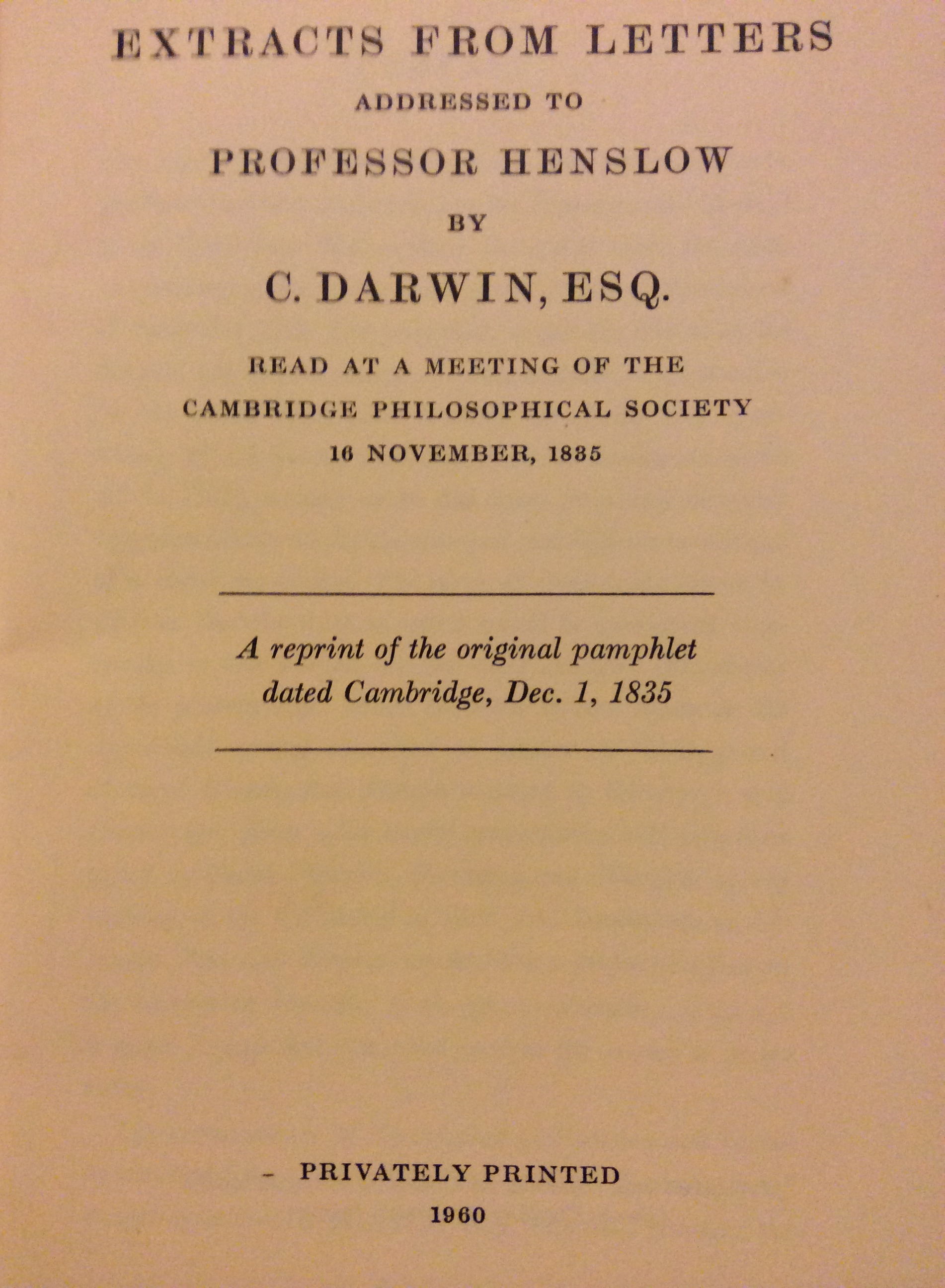
The front page of the 1960 reprint of Extracts from Letters to Henslow with a similar distribution to the original of 1835 - members and associates of the Cambridge Philosophical Society.

In 1960 it was reprinted privately and circulated to members and associates of the Cambridge Philosophical Society. This reprint has a preface by Dr Sydney Smith, Biological Secretary to the Society.

The preface in the 1960 reprint contends that the value of reprinting was partially because this was "the first writing of Charles Darwin ever to be published". In his Bibliographical Handlist, R. B. Freeman describes it as not having been published, and notes that Darwin had already been published in Records of captured insects, Stephens, J. F., Illustrations of British entomology 1829-1832.

The original pamphlet is now rare. According to American Book Prices Current only four copies have appeared at auction since 1975. Freeman 1; Norman 583. On 19 June 2014 Christies auctioned an original copy in New York (Sale 2861) and realised $221,000.
