= Second voyage of HMS Beagle =

Scientific survey mission, carrying Charles Darwin (1831–1836)

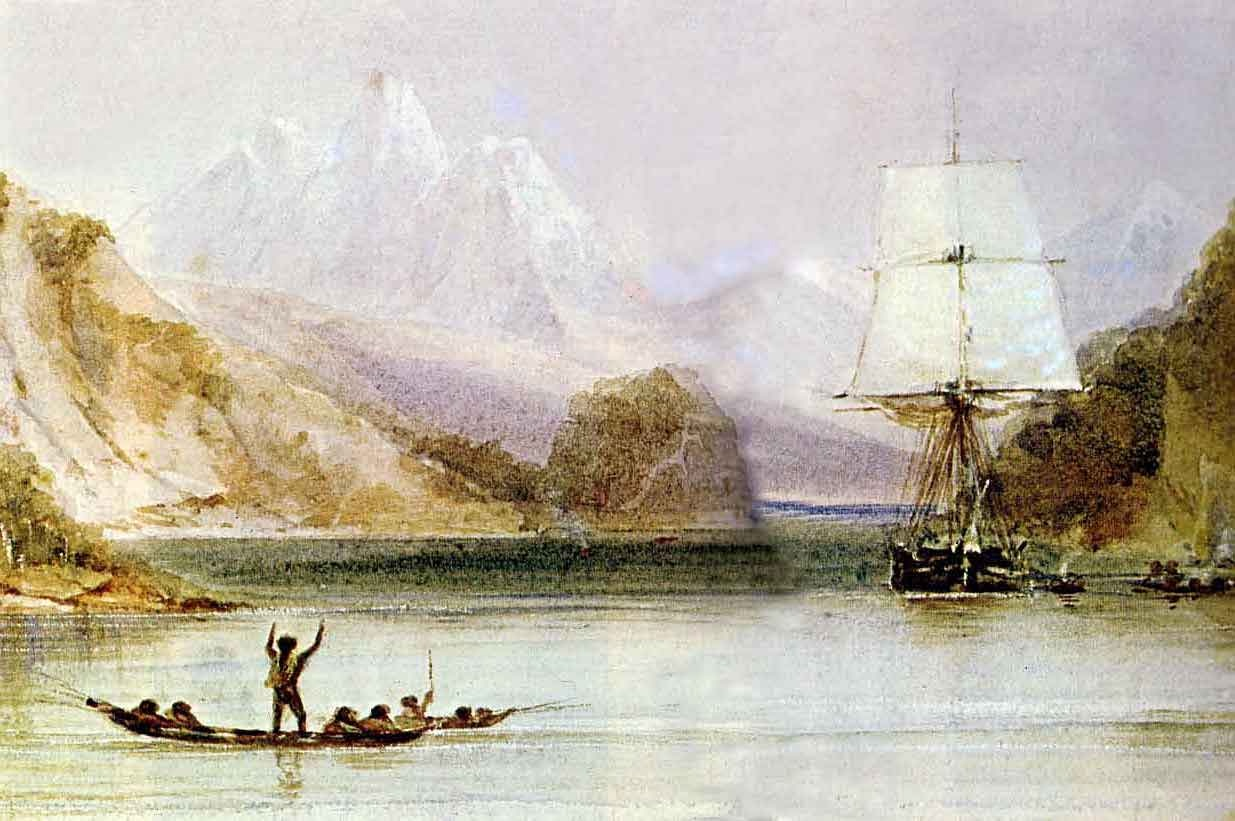
- Beagle at Ponsonby Sound in the Beagle Channel, Tierra del Fuego, in March 1834; painting by the ship's draughtsman Conrad Martens.
- Leader: Robert FitzRoy
- Start: 27 December 1831
- End: 2 October 1836
- Goal: Survey South American coast
- Ships: HMS Beagle
- Achievements: Research leading to Darwin's theory of evolution

Route

The second survey expedition of HMS Beagle took place from 27 December 1831 to 2 October 1836. Robert FitzRoy, the newest commander of Beagle, had thought of the advantages of having someone onboard who could investigate geology, and sought a naturalist to accompany them as a supernumerary. At the age of 22, the graduate Charles Darwin hoped to see the tropics before becoming a parson, and accepted the opportunity. He was greatly influenced by reading Charles Lyell's Principles of Geology during the voyage. By the end of the expedition, Darwin had made his name as a geologist, and fossil collector, and the publication of his journal (later known as The Voyage of the Beagle) gave him wide renown as a writer.

Beagle sailed across the Atlantic Ocean, and then carried out detailed hydrographic surveys around the coasts of southern South America, returning via Tahiti and Australia, after having circumnavigated the Earth. The initial offer to Darwin told him the voyage would last two years; it lasted almost five.

Darwin spent most of this time exploring on land: three years and three months on land, 18 months at sea. Early in the voyage, Darwin decided that he could write a geology book, and he showed a gift for theorising. At Punta Alta in Argentina, he made a major find of gigantic fossils of extinct mammals, then known from very few specimens. He collected and made detailed observations of plants and animals. His findings undermined his belief in the doctrine that species are fixed, and provided the basis for ideas which came to him when back in England, leading to his theory of evolution by natural selection.

== Aims of the expedition ==
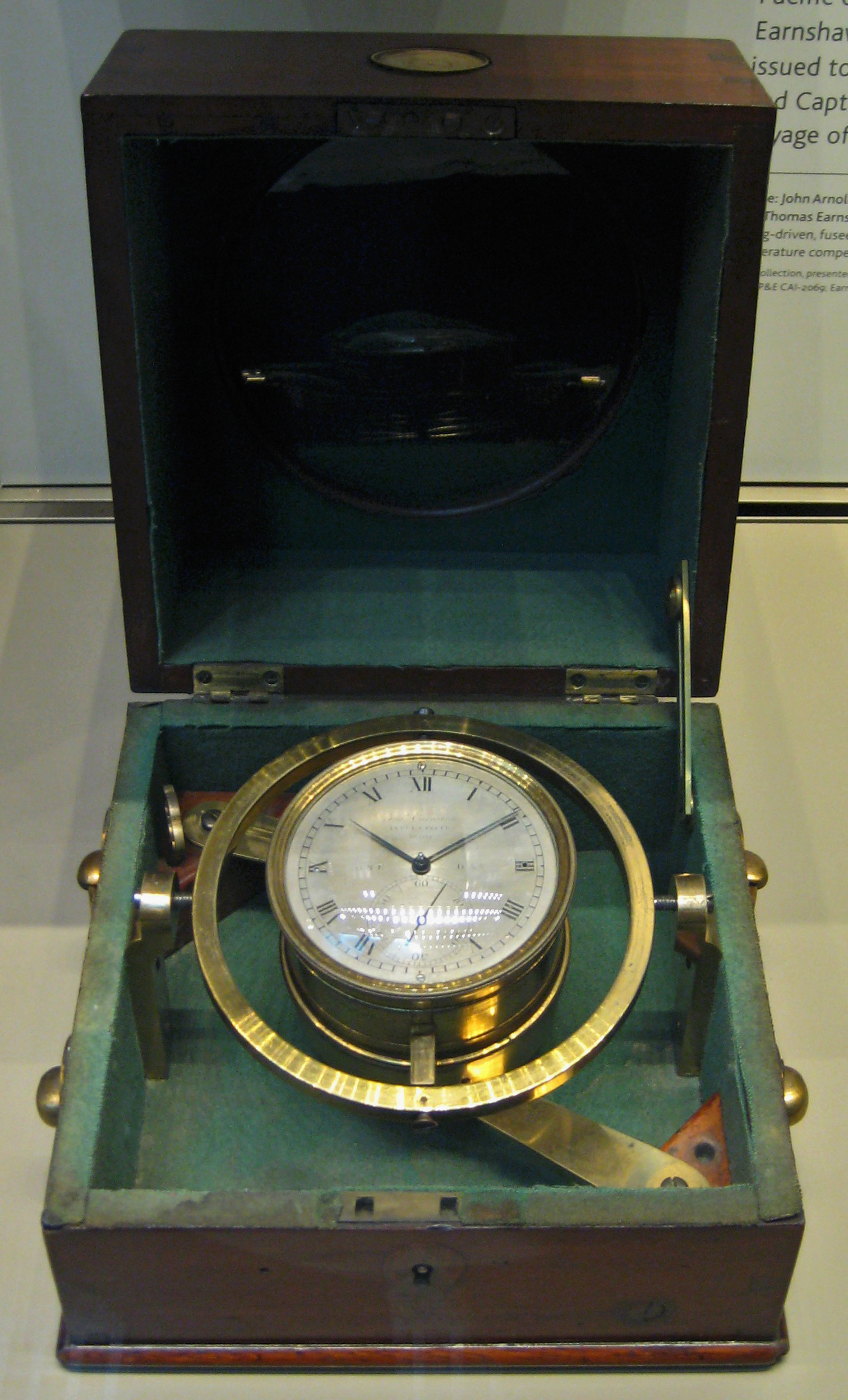
Ship's chronometer from HMS Beagle made by Thomas Earnshaw. British Museum, London.

When the Napoleonic Wars ended in 1815, the Pax Britannica saw seafaring nations competing in colonisation and rapid industrialisation. The logistics of supply and growing commerce needed reliable information about sea routes, but existing nautical charts were incomplete and inaccurate. Spanish American wars of independence ended Spain's monopoly over trade, and the UK's 1825 commercial treaty with Argentina recognised its independence, increasing the naval and commercial significance of the east coast of South America. The Admiralty instructed Commander King to make an accurate hydrographic survey of "the Southern Coasts of the Peninsula of South America, from the southern entrance of the River Plata, round to Chilóe; and of Tierra del Fuego". As Darwin wrote of his voyage, "The object of the expedition was to complete the survey of Patagonia and Tierra del Fuego, commenced under Captain King in 1826 to 1830—to survey the shores of Chile, Peru, and of some islands in the Pacific—and to carry a chain of chronometrical measurements round the World." The expeditions also had diplomatic objectives, visiting disputed territories.

An Admiralty memorandum set out the detailed instructions. The first requirement was to resolve disagreements in the earlier surveys about the longitude of Rio de Janeiro, which was essential as the base point for meridian distances. The accurate marine chronometers needed to determine longitude, had only become affordable since 1800; Beagle carried 22 chronometers to allow corrections. The ship was to stop at specified points for a four-day rating of the chronometers and to check them by astronomical observations: it was essential to take observations at Porto Praya and Fernando de Noronha to calibrate against the previous surveys of William Fitzwilliam Owen and Henry Foster. It was important to survey the extent of the Abrolhos Archipelago reefs, shown incorrectly in Albin Roussin's survey, then proceed to Rio de Janeiro to decide the exact longitude of Villegagnon Island off the Brazilian coast.

The real work of the survey was then to commence south of the Río de la Plata, with return trips to Montevideo for supplies; details were given of priorities, including surveying Tierra del Fuego and approaches to harbours on the Falkland Islands. The west coast was then to be surveyed as far north as time and resources permitted. The commander would then determine his own route west: season permitting, he could survey the Galápagos Islands. Then, Beagle was to proceed to Point Venus, Tahiti, and on to Port Jackson, Australia, which were known points to verify the chronometers.

No time was to be wasted on elaborate drawings; charts and plans should have notes and simple views of the land as seen from the sea showing measured heights of hills. Continued records of tides and meteorological conditions were also required. An additional suggestion was for a geological survey of a circular coral atoll in the Pacific Ocean including its profile and of tidal flows, to investigate the formation of such coral reefs.

== Context and preparations ==
The previous survey expedition to South America involved HMS Adventure and HMS Beagle under the overall command of the Australian Commander Phillip Parker King. During the survey, Beagle's captain, Pringle Stokes, committed suicide and command of the ship was given to the young aristocrat Robert FitzRoy, a nephew of George FitzRoy, 4th Duke of Grafton. When a ship's boat was taken by the natives of Tierra del Fuego, FitzRoy tried taking some of them hostage, and after this failed he got occupants of a canoe to put another on the ship in exchange for buttons. He brought four of them back to England to be given a Christian education, with the idea that they could eventually become missionaries. One died of smallpox. After Beagle's return to Devonport dockyard on 14 October 1830, Captain King retired.

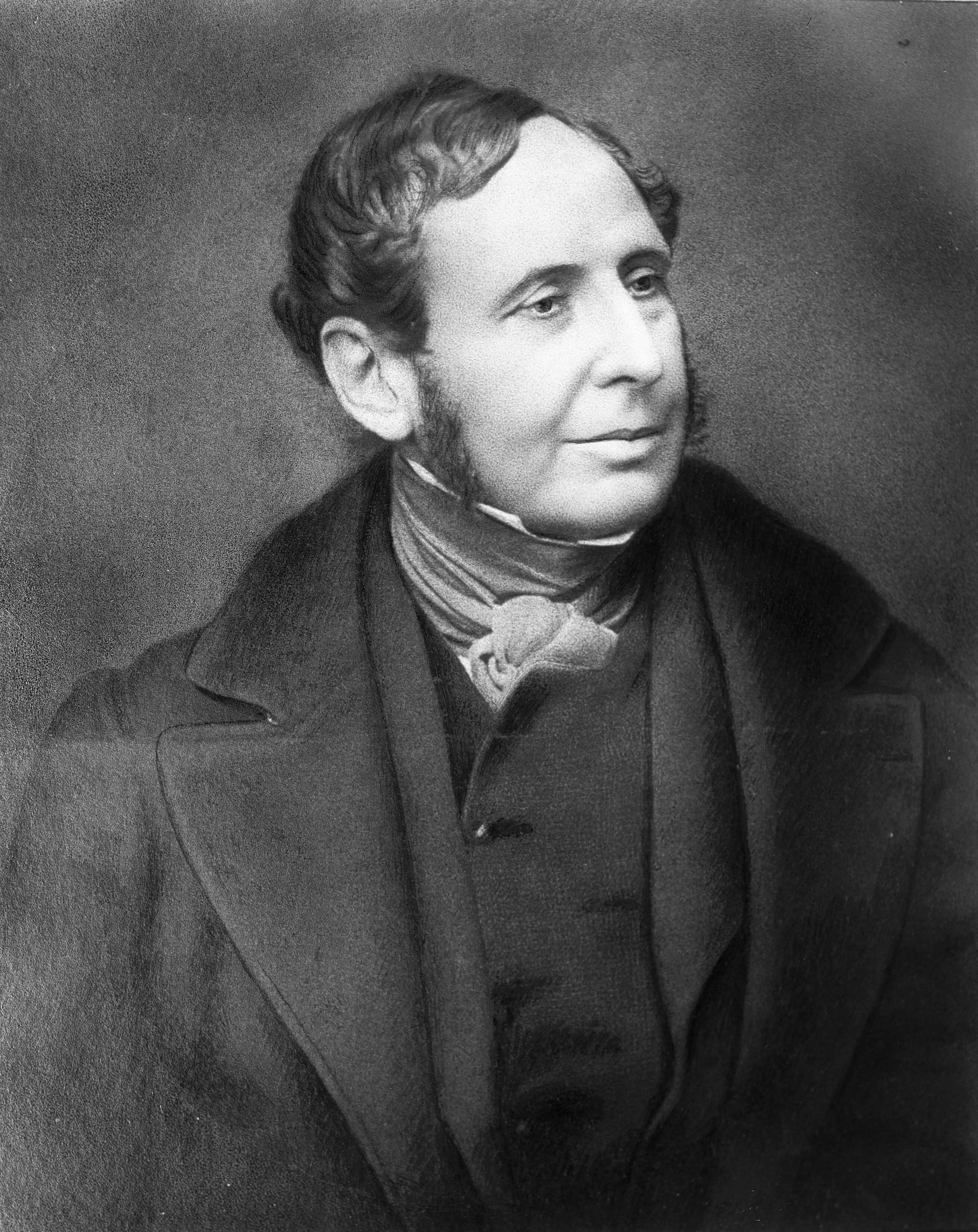
Robert FitzRoy

The 27-year-old FitzRoy had hopes of commanding a second expedition to continue the South American survey, but when he heard that the Lords of the Admiralty no longer supported this, he grew concerned about how to return the Fuegians. He made an agreement with the owner of a small merchant-vessel to take himself and five others back to South America, but a kind uncle heard of this and contacted the Admiralty. Soon afterwards, FitzRoy heard that he was to be appointed commander of HMS Chanticleer to go to Tierra del Fuego, but due to her poor condition, Beagle was substituted. On 27 June 1831, FitzRoy was commissioned as commander of the voyage, and Lieutenants John Clements Wickham and Bartholomew James Sulivan were both appointed.

Captain Francis Beaufort, the Hydrographer of the Admiralty, was invited to decide on the use that could be made of the voyage to continue the survey, and he discussed with FitzRoy plans for a voyage of several years, including a continuation of the trip around the world to establish median distances. Beagle was commissioned on 4 July 1831, under the command of Captain FitzRoy, who promptly spared no expense in having Beagle extensively refitted. Beagle was immediately taken into dock for extensive rebuilding and refitting. As she required a new deck, FitzRoy had the upper-deck raised considerably, by 8 inches (200 mm) aft and 12 inches (300 mm) forward. The Cherokee-class brig-sloops had the reputation of being "coffin brigs", which handled badly and were prone to sinking. By helping the decks to drain more quickly with less water collecting in the gunnels, the raised deck gave Beagle better handling and made her less liable to become top-heavy and capsize. Additional sheathing to the hull added about seven tons to her burthen and perhaps fifteen to her displacement.

The ship was one of the first to test the lightning conductor invented by William Snow Harris. FitzRoy obtained five examples of the Sympiesometer, a kind of mercury-free barometer patented by Alexander Adie and favoured by FitzRoy as giving the accurate readings required by the Admiralty.

In addition to its officers and crew, Beagle carried several supernumeraries, passengers without an official position. FitzRoy employed a mathematical instrument maker to maintain his 22 marine chronometers kept in his cabin, as well as engaging the artist/draughtsman Augustus Earle to go in a private capacity. The three Fuegians taken on the previous voyage were going to be returned to Tierra del Fuego on Beagle together with the missionary Richard Matthews.

=== Naturalist and geologist ===
For Beaufort and the leading Cambridge "gentlemen of science", the opportunity for a naturalist to join the expedition fitted with their drive to revitalise British government policy on science. This elite disdained research done for money and felt that natural philosophy was for gentlemen, not tradesmen. The officer class of the Army and Navy provided a way to ascend this hierarchy; the ship's surgeon often collected specimens on voyages, and Robert McCormick had secured the position on Beagle after taking part in earlier expeditions and studying natural history. A sizeable collection had considerable social value, attracting wide public interest, and McCormick aspired to fame as an exploring naturalist. Collections made by the ship's surgeon and other officers were government property, though the Admiralty was not consistent on this, and went to important London establishments, usually the British Museum. The Admiralty instructions for the first voyage had required officers "to use their best diligence in increasing the Collections in each ship: the whole of which must be understood to belong to the Public", but on the second voyage this requirement was omitted, and the officers were free to keep all the specimens for themselves.

FitzRoy's journal written during the first voyage noted that, while investigating magnetic rocks near the Bárbara Channel, he regretted "that no person in the vessel was skilled in mineralogy, or at all acquainted with geology", to make use of the opportunity of "ascertaining the nature of the rocks and earths" of the areas surveyed. FitzRoy decided that on any similar future expedition, he would "endeavour to carry out a person qualified to examine the land; while the officers, and myself, would attend to hydrography." This indicated a need for a naturalist qualified to examine geology, who would spend considerable periods onshore away from the ship. McCormick lacked expertise in geology and had to attend to his duties on the ship.

FitzRoy knew that commanding a ship could involve stress and loneliness. He was aware of his uncle Viscount Castlereagh's suicide due to stress from overwork, as well as Captain Stokes's suicide. This was to be the first time that FitzRoy would be fully in charge of a ship with no commanding officer or second captain to consult. It has been suggested that he felt the need for a gentleman companion who shared his scientific interests and could dine with him as an equal, although there is no direct evidence to support this. Professor John Stevens Henslow described the position "more as a companion than a mere collector", but this was an assurance that FitzRoy would treat his guest as a gentleman naturalist. Several other ships at this period carried unpaid civilians as naturalists.

Early in August, FitzRoy discussed this position with Beaufort, who had a scientific network of friends at the University of Cambridge. At Beaufort's request, mathematics lecturer George Peacock wrote from London to Henslow about this "rare opportunity for a naturalist", saying that an "offer has been made to me to recommend a proper person to go out as a naturalist with this expedition", and suggesting the Reverend Leonard Jenyns. Though Jenyns nearly accepted and even packed his clothes, he had concerns about his obligations as vicar of Swaffham Bulbeck and about his health, therefore Jenyns declined the offer. Henslow briefly thought of going, but his wife "looked so miserable" that he quickly dropped the idea. Both recommended bringing the 22-year-old Charles Darwin, who was on a geology field trip with Adam Sedgwick. He had just completed the ordinary Bachelor of Arts degree which was a prerequisite for his intended career as a parson.

==== Offer of place to Darwin ====
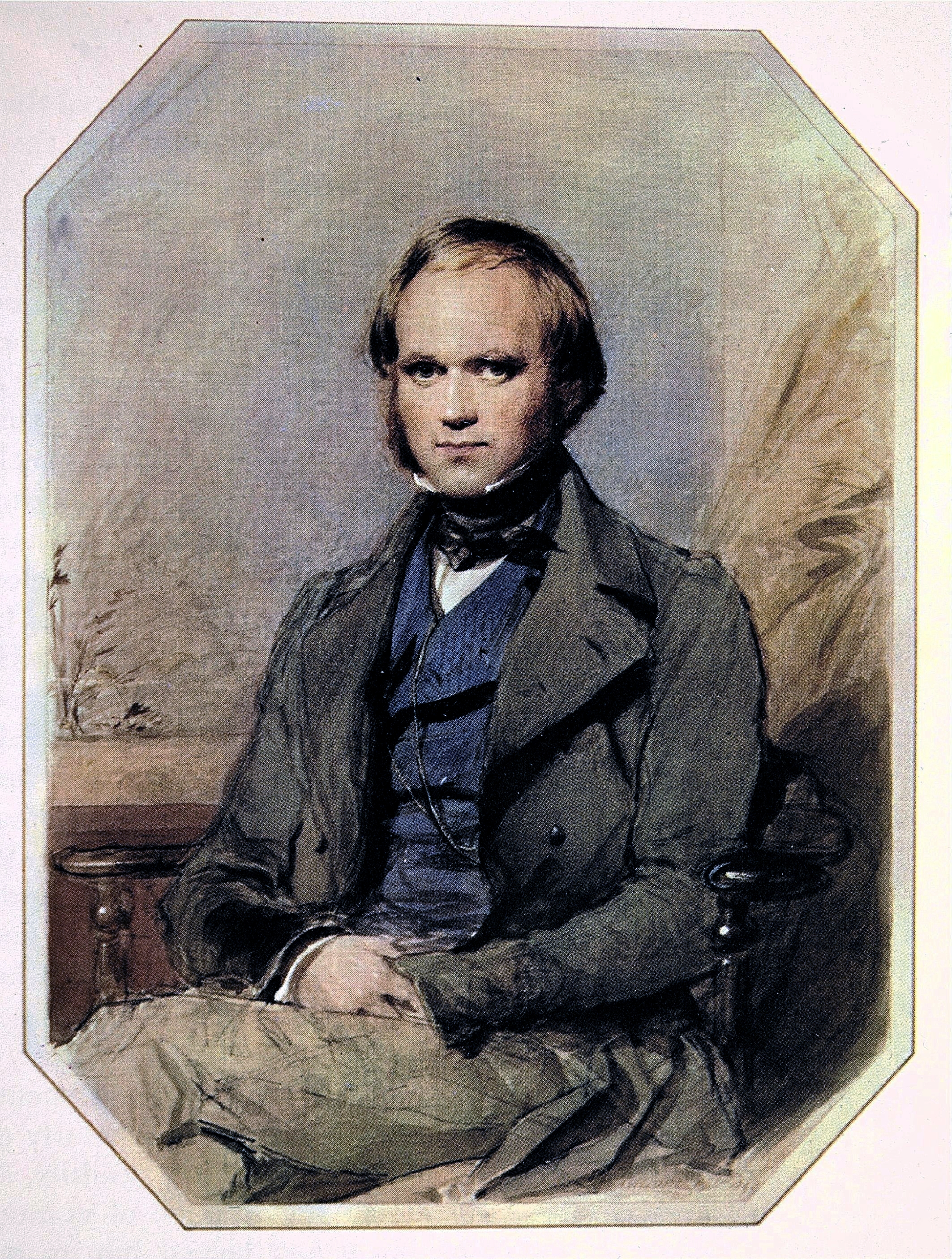
Darwin in 1840, after the voyage and publication of his Journal and Remarks

Darwin fitted well the expectations of a gentleman natural philosopher and was well trained as a naturalist. When he had studied geology in his second year at Edinburgh, he had found it dull, but from Easter to August 1831, he learned a great deal with Sedgwick and developed a strong interest during their geological field trip. On 24 August Henslow wrote to Darwin:

...that I consider you to be the best qualified person I know of who is likely to undertake such a situation—I state this not on the supposition of yr. being a finished Naturalist, but as amply qualified for collecting, observing, & noting any thing worthy to be noted in Natural History. Peacock has the appointment at his disposal & if he can not find a man willing to take the office, the opportunity will probably be lost—Capt. F. wants a man (I understand) more as a companion than a mere collector & would not take any one however good a Naturalist who was not recommended to him likewise as a gentleman. ... The Voyage is to last 2 ^{yrs.} & if you take plenty of Books with you, any thing you please may be done ... there never was a finer chance for a man of zeal & spirit... Don't put on any modest doubts or fears about your disqualifications for I assure you I think you are the very man they are in search of.

The letter went first to George Peacock, who quickly forwarded it to Darwin with further details, confirming that the "ship sails about the end of September". Peacock had discussed the offer with Beaufort, "he entirely approves of it & you may consider the situation as at your absolute disposal". When Darwin returned home from the field trip late on 29 August and opened the letters, his father objected strongly to the voyage so, the next day, he wrote declining the offer and left to go shooting at the estate of his uncle Josiah Wedgwood II. With Wedgwood's help, Darwin's father was persuaded to relent and fund his son's expedition, and on Thursday 1 September, Darwin wrote to Beaufort accepting the offer. That day, Beaufort wrote to tell FitzRoy that his friend Peacock had "succeeded in getting a 'Savant' for you—A Mr Darwin grandson of the well known philosopher and poet—full of zeal and enterprize and having contemplated a voyage on his own account to S. America". On Friday Darwin left for Cambridge, where he, the next day, got advice on preparations of the voyage and references to experts by Henslow.

Alexander Charles Wood (an undergraduate whose tutor was Peacock) wrote from Cambridge to his cousin FitzRoy to recommend Darwin. Around midday on Sunday 4 September, Wood received FitzRoy's response, "straightforward and gentlemanlike" but strongly against Darwin joining the expedition; both Darwin and Henslow then "gave up the scheme". Darwin went to London anyway, and next morning met FitzRoy, who explained that he had promised the place to his friend Mr. Chester (possibly the novelist Harry Chester), but Chester had turned it down in a letter received not five minutes before Darwin arrived. FitzRoy emphasised the difficulties, including cramped conditions and plain food. Darwin would be on the Admiralty's books to get provisions (worth £40 a year) and, like the ship's officers and captain, would pay £30 a year towards the mess bill. Including outfitting, the cost to him was unlikely to reach £500. The ship would sail on 10 October, and would probably be away for three years. They talked and dined together, and soon found each other agreeable. The Tory FitzRoy had been cautious at the prospect of companionship with this unknown young gentleman of Whig background, and later admitted that his letter to Wood was "to throw cold water on the scheme" in "a sudden horror of the chances of having somebody he should not like on board". He half-seriously told Darwin later that, as "an ardent disciple of Lavater", he had nearly rejected Darwin on the phrenological basis that the shape (or physiognomy) of Darwin's nose indicated a lack of determination.

==== Darwin's preparations ====
While he continued to get acquainted with FitzRoy, going shopping together, Darwin rushed around to arrange his supplies and equipment. He took advice from experts on specimen preservation including William Yarrell at the Zoological Society of London, Robert Brown at the British Museum, Captain Phillip Parker King who led the first expedition, and invertebrate anatomist Robert Edmond Grant who had tutored Darwin at Edinburgh. Yarrell gave invaluable advice and bargained with shopkeepers, so Darwin paid £50 for two pistols and a rifle, while FitzRoy had spent £400 on firearms. On Sunday, 11 September, FitzRoy and Darwin took the steam packet for Portsmouth. Darwin was not seasick and had a pleasant "sail of three days". For the first time, he saw the "very small" cramped ship, met the officers, and was glad to get a large cabin, shared with the assistant surveyor John Lort Stokes. On Friday, Darwin rushed back to London, "250 miles in 24 hours", and on via Cambridge and St. Albans, travelling on the Wonder coach all day on 22 September to arrive in Shrewsbury that evening, then after a last brief visit to family and friends left for London on 2 October. Delays to Beagle gave Darwin an extra week to consult experts and complete packing his baggage. After sending his heavy goods down by steam packet, he took the coach along with Augustus Earle and arrived at Devonport on 24 October.

The geologist Charles Lyell asked FitzRoy to record observations on geological features such as erratic boulders. Before they left England, FitzRoy gave Darwin a copy of the first volume of Lyell's Principles of Geology which explained features as the outcome of a gradual process taking place over extremely long periods of time. In his autobiography, Darwin recalled Henslow giving advice at this time to obtain and study the book, "but on no account to accept the views therein advocated".

Darwin's position as a naturalist on board was as a self-funded guest with no official appointment, and he could leave the voyage at any suitable stage. At the outset, George Peacock had advised that "The Admiralty are not disposed to give a salary, though they will furnish you with an official appointment & every accomodation [sic]: if a salary should be required however I am inclined to think that it would be granted". Far from wanting this, Darwin's concern was to maintain control over his collection. He was even reluctant to be on the Admiralty's books for victuals until he got assurances from FitzRoy and Beaufort that this would not affect his rights to assign his specimens.

Beaufort initially thought specimens ought to go to the British Museum, but Darwin had heard of many left waiting to be described, including botanical specimens from the first Beagle voyage. Beaufort assured him that he "should have no difficulty" as long as he "presented them to some public body" such as the Zoological or Geological societies. Henslow had set up the small Cambridge Philosophical Society museum, Darwin told him that new finds should go to the "largest & most central collection" rather than a "Country collection, let it be ever so good", but soon expressed "hope to be able to assist the Philosoph. Society" with some specimens.

FitzRoy arranged transport of specimens to England as official cargo on the Admiralty Packet Service, at no cost to Darwin even though it was his private collection. Henslow agreed to store them at Cambridge, and Darwin confirmed with him arrangements for land carriage from the port, to be funded by Darwin's father.

==== Darwin's work on the expedition ====
The captain had to record his survey in painstaking paperwork, and Darwin too kept a daily log as well as detailed notebooks of his finds and speculations, and a diary which became his journal. Darwin's notebooks show complete professionalism that he had probably learnt at the University of Edinburgh when making natural history notes while exploring the shores of the Firth of Forth with his brother Erasmus in 1826 and studying marine invertebrates with Robert Edmund Grant for a few months in 1827. Darwin had also collected beetles at Cambridge, but he was a novice in all other areas of natural history. To aid in his observations Darwin made used of various devices for measuring and interpreting data, including a pocket-sized colour manual by Patrick Syme.

During the voyage, Darwin investigated small invertebrates while collecting specimens of other creatures for experts to examine and describe once Beagle had returned to England. More than half of his carefully organised zoology notes deal with marine invertebrates. The notes also record closely reasoned interpretations of what he found about their complex internal anatomy while dissecting specimens under his microscope and small experiments on their response to stimulation. His onshore observations included intense, analytical comments on possible reasons for the behaviour, distribution, and relation to their environment of the creatures he saw. He made good use of the ship's excellent library of books on natural history but continually questioned their correctness.

Geology was Darwin's "principal pursuit" on the expedition, and his notes on that subject were almost four times larger than his zoology notes, although he kept extensive records on both. During the voyage, he wrote to his sister that "there is nothing like geology; the pleasure of the first days partridge shooting or first days hunting cannot be compared to finding a fine group of fossil bones, which tell their story of former times with almost a living tongue". To him, investigating geology brought reasoning into play and gave him opportunities for theorising.

== Voyage ==
The voyage of Beagle

Charles Darwin had been told that Beagle was expected to sail about the end of September 1831, but fitting out took longer. The Admiralty Instructions were received on 14 November, and on 23 November, she was moved to anchorage, ready to depart. Repeated westerly gales caused delays, and forced them to turn back after departing on 10 and 21 December. Drunkenness at Christmas lost another day. Finally, on the morning of 27 December, Beagle left its anchorage in the Barn Pool, under Mount Edgecumbe on the west side of Plymouth Sound and set out on its surveying expedition.

=== Atlantic islands ===
Beagle touched at Madeira for a confirmed position without stopping. Then on 6 January, it reached Tenerife in the Canary Islands but was quarantined there because of cholera in England. Although tantalisingly near to the town of Santa Cruz, to Darwin's intense disappointment, they were denied landing. With improving weather conditions, they sailed on. On 10 January, Darwin tried out a plankton net he had devised to be towed behind the ship—only the second recorded use of such a net (after use by John Vaughan Thompson in 1816). Next day, he noted the great number of animals collected far from land and wrote: "Many of these creatures so low in the scale of nature are most exquisite in their forms & rich colours. — It creates a feeling of wonder that so much beauty should be apparently created for such little purpose."

Six days later, they made their first landing at Praia on the volcanic island of Santiago in the Cape Verde Islands. It is here that Darwin's description in his published Journal begins. His initial impression was of a desolate and sterile volcanic island. However, upon visiting the town, he came to a deep valley where he "first saw the glory of tropical vegetation" and had "a glorious day", finding overwhelming novelty in the sights and sounds. FitzRoy set up tents and an observatory on Quail Island to determine the exact position of the islands, while Darwin collected numerous sea animals, delighting in vivid tropical corals in tidal pools, and investigating the geology of Quail Island. Though Daubeny's book in Beagle's library described the volcanic geology of the Canary Islands, it said that the structure of the Cape Verde Islands was "too imperfectly known". Darwin saw Quail Island as his key to understanding the structure of St. Jago and made careful studies of its stratigraphy in the way he had learnt from Adam Sedgwick. He collected specimens and described a white layer of hard white rock formed from crushed coral and seashells lying between layers of black volcanic rocks, and noted a similar white layer running horizontally in the black cliffs of St. Jago at 40 feet (12 m) above sea level. The seashells were, as far as he could tell, "the same as those of present day". He speculated that in geologically recent times a lava flow had covered this shell sand on the sea bed, and then the strata had slowly risen to their present level. Charles Lyell's Principles of Geology presented a thesis of gradual rising and falling of the Earth's crust illustrated by the changing levels of the Temple of Serapis. Darwin implicitly supported Lyell by remarking that "Dr. Daubeny when mentioning the present state of the temple of Serapis. doubts the possibility of a surface of country being raised without cracking buildings on it. – I feel sure at St Jago in some places a town might have been raised without injuring a house." Later, in his first letter to Henslow, he wrote that "The geology was preeminently interesting & I believe quite new: there are some facts on a large scale of upraised coast ... that would interest Mr. Lyell." While still on the island, Darwin was inspired to think of writing a book on geology, and later wrote of "seeing a thing never seen by Lyell, one yet saw it partially through his eyes".

Beagle's surgeon Robert McCormick sought fame and fortune as an explorer. When they first met at the start of the voyage, Darwin had commented that "My friend [McCormick] is an ass, but we jog on very amicably". They walked into the countryside of St. Jago together, and Darwin, influenced by Lyell, found the surgeon's approach old-fashioned. They found a remarkable baobab tree, which FitzRoy measured and sketched. Darwin went on subsequent "riding expeditions" with Benjamin Bynoe and Rowlett to visit Ribeira Grande and St Domingo. FitzRoy extended their stay to 23 days to complete his measurements of magnetism. Darwin subsequently wrote to Henslow that his collecting included "several specimens of an Octopus, which possessed a most marvellous power of changing its colours; equalling any chamaelion, & evidently accommodating the changes to the colour of the ground which it passed over.—yellowish green, dark brown & red were the prevailing colours: this fact appears to be new, as far as I can find out." Henslow replied that "The fact is not new, but any fresh observations will be highly important."

McCormick increasingly resented the favours FitzRoy gave to assist Darwin with collecting. On 16 February, FitzRoy landed a small party including himself and Darwin on St. Paul's Rocks, finding the seabirds so tame that they could be killed easily, while an exasperated McCormick was left circling the islets in a second small boat. That evening, novices were greeted by a pseudo-Neptune, and in the morning, they crossed the equator with the traditional line-crossing ceremony.

Darwin had a special position as a guest and social equal of the captain, so junior officers called him "sir" until the captain dubbed Darwin Philos for "ship's philosopher", which became his suitably respectful nickname.

=== Surveying South America ===
In South America, Beagle carried out its survey work going to and fro along the coasts to allow careful measurement and rechecking. Darwin made long journeys inland with travelling companions from the locality. He spent much of the time away from the ship, returning by prearrangement when Beagle returned to ports where mail and newspapers were received, and Darwin's notes, journals, and collections sent back to England, via the Admiralty Packet Service. He had ensured that his collections were his own and, as prearranged, batches of his specimens were shipped to England, then taken by land carriage to Henslow in Cambridge to await his return. The first batch was sent in August 1832, journey time varied considerably but all batches were eventually delivered.

Several others on board, including FitzRoy and other officers, were able amateur naturalists, and they gave Darwin generous assistance as well as making collections for the Crown, which the Admiralty placed in the British Museum.

==== Tropical paradise and slavery ====
Due to heavy surf, they only stayed at Fernando de Noronha for a day to make the required observations, then FitzRoy pressed on to Bahia de Todos Santos, Brazil, to rate the chronometers and take on water. They reached the continent and arrived at the port on 28 February. Darwin was thrilled at the magnificent sight of "the town of Bahia or S^{t} Salvador", with large ships at harbour scattered across the bay. On the next day, he was in "transports of pleasure" walking by himself in the tropical forest, and in "long naturalizing walks" with others continued to "add raptures to the former raptures".

He found the sights of slavery offensive, and when FitzRoy defended the practice by describing a visit to a slaveowner whose slaves replied "no" on being asked by their master if they wished to be freed, Darwin suggested that answers in such circumstances were worthless. Enraged that his word had been questioned, FitzRoy lost his temper and banned Darwin from his company. The officers had nicknamed such outbursts "hot coffee", and within hours FitzRoy apologised, and asked Darwin to remain. Later, FitzRoy had to remain silent when Captain Paget of the frigate HMS Samarang (another British vessel surveying the region which often crossed paths with the Beagle) visited them and recounted "facts about slavery so revolting" that undermined his claim. Surveying of sandbanks around the harbour was completed on 18 March, and the ship made its way down the coast to survey the extent and depths of the Abrolhos reefs, completing and correcting Roussin's survey.

They manoeuvred Beagle into Rio de Janeiro harbour "in first rate style" on 4 April, with Darwin enthusiastically helping. Amidst excitement at opening letters from home, he was taken aback by news that his close friend Fanny Owen was engaged to marry Biddulph of Chirk Castle. Augustus Earle showed Darwin round the town, and they found a delightful cottage for lodgings at Botafogo. Darwin made arrangements with local estate owners, and on 8 April set off with them on a strenuous "riding excursion" to Rio Macaé.

McCormick had made himself disagreeable to FitzRoy and first lieutenant Wickham, so was "invalided home", as he also was on other voyages. In his 1884 memoirs, he claimed he had been "very much disappointed in my expectations of carrying out my natural history pursuits, every obstacle having been placed in the way of my getting on shore and making collections". Assistant Surgeon Benjamin Bynoe was made acting surgeon in his place.

The required observations from Villegagnon Island at Rio showed a discrepancy of 4 miles (6.4 km) of longitude in the meridian distance from Bahia to Rio, compared to Roussin's results, and FitzRoy wrote telling Beaufort he would go back to check.

On 24 April Darwin got back to the ship, next day his books, papers, and equipment suffered minor damage when the boat taking him to Botafogo cottage was swamped. He sent his sister his "commonplace Journal" to date, inviting criticisms, and decided to stay in the cottage with Earle while the ship went to Bahia.

Eight of the crew had gone snipe shooting in the cutter, with an overnight stay at the Macacu River near Rio. After their return on 2 May, some fell ill with fever. The ship set off on 10 May, a seaman died en route, a ship's boy and a young midshipman died at Bahia. The ship returned to Rio on 3 June. Having confirmed that his measurements were correct, FitzRoy sent corrections to Roussin.

At the cottage, Darwin composed his first letter outlining his collecting to Henslow. He said he would not "send a box till we arrive at Monte Video.—it is too great a loss of time both for Carpenters & myself to pack up whilst in harbor". He returned to the ship on 26 June, and they set sail on 5 July.

Amidst political changes, Beagle had a diplomatic role. As they arrived at Montevideo on 26 July, HMS Druid signalled them to "clear for action" as British property had been seized in growing unrest after "military usurpation" deposed Lavalleja. They took observations for the chronometers, then on 31 July sailed to Buenos Aires to meet the governor and get maps, but were met by warning shots from a guard ship. FitzRoy promptly lodged a complaint and departed, threatening a broadside in response to any further provocation. When they got back on 4 August, FitzRoy informed the Druid's captain who set off to demand an apology. On 5 August, Town officials and the British Consul asked FitzRoy for help to quell a mutiny; the garrison was held by Black troops loyal to Lavalleja. With Darwin and 50 well-armed men from the ship he arrived at the fort, then next day withdrew leaving a stand-off. Darwin enjoyed the excitement, and wrote "It was something new to me to walk with Pistols & Cutlass through the streets of a Town". Druid returned on 15 August, with a long apology from the government and news that the guard-ship captain had been arrested.

Darwin's first box of specimens was ready, and went on the Falmouth packet Emulous, departing on 19 August, Henslow received the box in mid January. On 22 August, after taking soundings in Samborombón Bay, Beagle began survey work down the coast from Cape San Antonio, Buenos Aires Province, Argentina.

==== Fossil finds ====
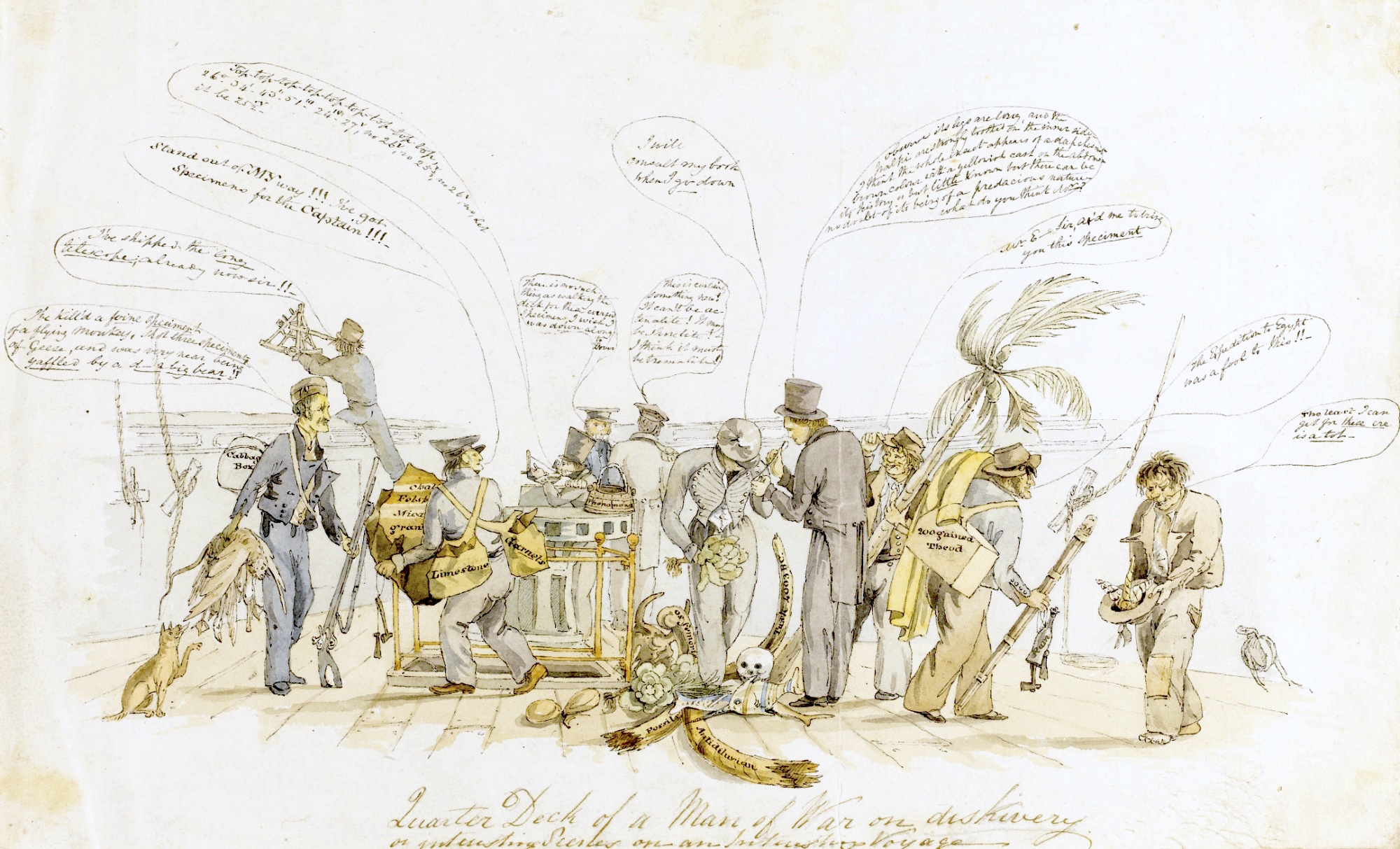
Scene on the quarterdeck while anchored at Bahia Blanca, painted around 24 September 1832 most likely by Augustus Earle. Darwin is the central figure in a top hat, examining a specimen, FitzRoy the second figure to his left.

At Bahía Blanca, in the southern part of present Buenos Aires Province, Darwin rode inland into Patagonia with gauchos: he saw them use bolas to bring down "ostriches" (rheas) and ate roast armadillo. With FitzRoy, he went for "a very pleasant cruize about the bay" on 22 September, and about ten miles (16 km) from the ship, they stopped for a while at Punta Alta. In low cliffs near the point, Darwin found conglomerate rocks containing numerous shells and fossilised teeth and bones of gigantic extinct mammals, in strata near an earth layer with shells and armadillo fossils, suggesting to him quiet tidal deposits rather than a catastrophe. With assistance (possibly from the young sailor Syms Covington acting as his servant), Darwin collected numerous fossils over several days, amusing others with "the cargoes of apparent rubbish which he frequently brought on board".

Much of the second day was taken up with excavating a large skull which Darwin found embedded in soft rock, and seemed to him to be allied to the rhinoceros. On 8 October, he returned to the site and found a jawbone and tooth which he was able to identify using Bory de Saint-Vincent's Dictionnaire classique. He wrote home describing this and the large skull as Megatherium fossils, or perhaps Megalonyx, and excitedly noted that the only specimens in Europe were locked away in the King's collection at Madrid. In the same layer he found a large surface of polygonal plates of bony armour. His immediate thought was that they came from an enormous armadillo like the small creatures common in the area. However, from Cuvier's misleading description of the Madrid specimen and a recent newspaper report about a fossil collected by Woodbine Parish, Darwin thought that the bony armour identified the fossil as Megatherium. With FitzRoy, Darwin went about 30 miles (48 km) across the bay to Monte Hermoso on 19 October and found numerous fossils of smaller rodents in contrast to the huge Edentatal mammals of Punta Alta.

They returned to Montevideo, and on 2 November revisited Buenos Aires, passing the guard-ship which now gave them due respect. From questioning the finder of the Megatherium reported in the newspaper (Woodbine Parish's agent), Darwin concluded it came from the same geological formation as his own fossil finds. He also "purchased fragments of some enormous bones" which he "was assured belonged to the former giants!!" In Montevideo from 14 November, he packaged his specimens, including all the fossils, and sent this cargo on the Duke of York Falmouth packet.

The mail from home included a copy of the second volume of Charles Lyell's Principles of Geology, a refutation of Lamarckism in which there was no shared ancestry of different species or overall progress to match the gradual geological change. Instead, it was a continuing cycle in which species mysteriously appeared, closely adapted to their "centres of creation", then became extinct when the environment changed to their disadvantage.

==== Tierra del Fuego ====
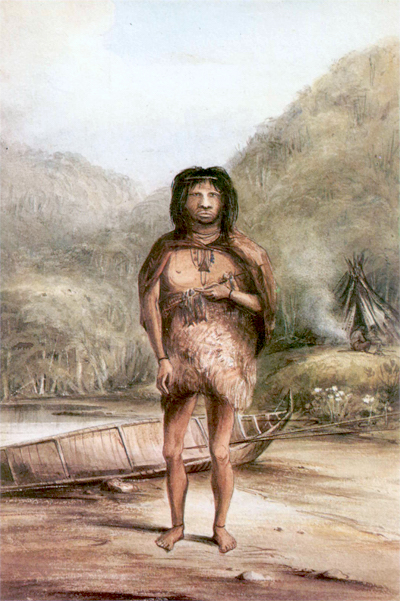
Native of Tierra del Fuego by Conrad Martens

They reached Tierra del Fuego on 18 December 1832, and Darwin was taken by surprise at what he perceived as the crude savagery of the Yaghan natives, in stark contrast to the "civilised" behaviour of the three Fuegians they were returning as missionaries (who had been given the names York Minster, Fuegia Basket and Jemmy Button). He described his first meeting with the native Fuegians as being "without exception the most curious and interesting spectacle I ever beheld: I could not have believed how wide was the difference between savage and civilised man: it is greater than between a wild and domesticated animal, inasmuch as in man there is a greater power of improvement." They appeared like "the representations of Devils on the Stage" as in Der Freischütz. In contrast, he said of Jemmy that "It seems yet wonderful to me, when I think over all his many good qualities, that he should have been of the same race, and doubtless partaken of the same character, with the miserable, degraded savages whom we first met here." (Four decades later, he recalled these impressions in The Descent of Man to support his argument that just as humans had descended from "a lower form", civilised society had arisen by graduations from a more primitive state. He recalled how closely the Fuegians on board Beagle "resembled us in disposition and in most of our mental faculties.")

At the island of "Buttons Land" on 23 January 1833, they set up a mission post with huts, gardens, furniture and crockery. Upon returning nine days later, the possessions had been looted and divided up equally by the natives. Matthews gave up, rejoining the ship and leaving the three civilised Fuegians to continue the missionary work. Beagle went on to the Falkland Islands, arriving just after the British return. Darwin studied the relationships of species to habitats and found ancient fossils like those he found in Wales. FitzRoy bought a schooner to assist with the surveying, and they returned to Patagonia, where it was fitted with a new copper bottom and renamed Adventure. Syms Covington assisted Darwin in preserving specimens, and his collecting was so successful that, with FitzRoy's agreement, he hired Covington as a full-time servant for £30 a year.

==== Gauchos, rheas, fossils and geology ====
The two ships sailed to the Río Negro in Argentina, and on 8 August 1833, Darwin left on another journey inland with the gauchos. On 12 August, he met General Juan Manuel de Rosas who was then leading a punitive expedition in his military campaign against native "Indians" and obtained a passport from him. As they crossed the pampas, the gauchos and Indians told Darwin of a rare smaller species of rhea. After three days at Bahía Blanca, he grew tired of waiting for Beagle, and on 21 August, revisited Punta Alta where he reviewed the geology of the site in light of his new knowledge, wondering if the bones were older than the seashells. He was very successful with searching for bones, and on 1 September, found a near-complete skeleton with its bones still in position.

He set off again and on 1 October, while searching the cliffs of the Carcarañá River, found "an enormous gnawing tooth", and then, in a cliff of the Paraná River, saw "two great groups of immense bones" which were too soft to collect but a tooth fragment identified them as mastodons. Illness delayed him at Santa Fe, and after seeing the fossilised casing of a huge armadillo embedded in rock, he was puzzled to find a horse tooth in the same rock layer since horses had been introduced to the continent with European migration. They took a riverboat down the Paraná River to Buenos Aires but became entangled in a revolution as rebels allied to Rosas blockaded the city. The passport helped, and with Covington, he managed to escape in a boatload of refugees. They rejoined Beagle at Montevideo.

As surveys were still in progress, Darwin set off on another 400-mile (640 km) "galloping" trip in Banda Oriental to see the Uruguay River and visit the Estancia of Mr Keen near Mercedes on the Río Negro. On 25 November, he "heard of some giants bones, which as usual turned out to be those of the Megatherium" but could only extract a few broken fragments. The next day, he visited a nearby house and bought "a head of a Megatherium which must have been when found quite perfect" for about two shillings, though the teeth had since been broken and the lower jaw had been lost. Mr Keen arranged to ship the skull downriver to Buenos Aires. At Las Piedras, a clergyman let him see fossils, including a club-like tail which he sketched and called an "extraordinary weapon". His notes included a page showing his realisation that the cliff banks of the rivers exposed two strata formed in an estuary interrupted by an undersea stratum, indicating that the land had risen and fallen.

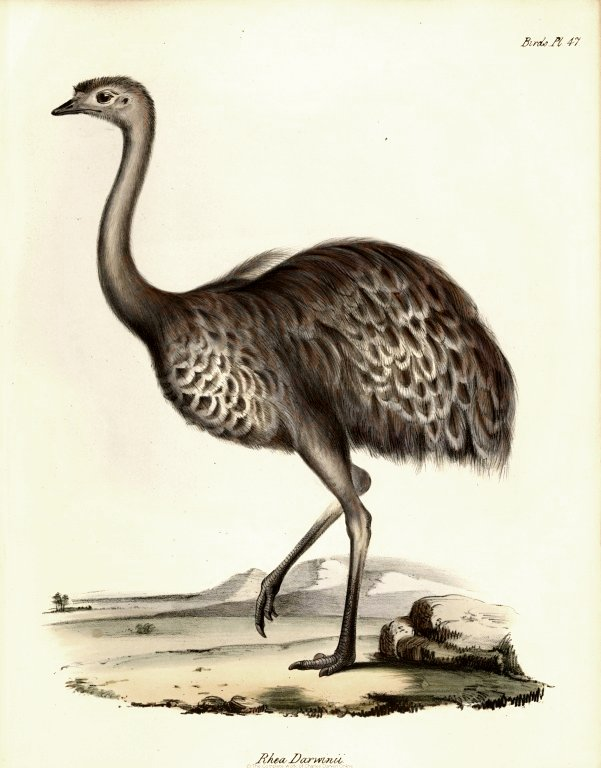
Illustration of Darwin's rhea, published in 1841 in John Gould's description of birds collected on Beagle's voyage

Back at Montevideo, Darwin was introduced to Conrad Martens, the replacement artist brought on board Beagle after Augustus Earle had to leave due to health problems. They sailed south, putting in at Port Desire on 23 December, and the following day Darwin shot a guanaco which provided them with a Christmas meal. Early in the new year, Martens shot a rhea which they enjoyed eating before Darwin realised that this was the elusive smaller rhea and preserved the remains. On 9 January 1834, 110 miles (180 km) further south, they reached Port St Julian and exploring the local geology in cliffs near the harbour Darwin found fossils of pieces of spine and a hind leg of "some large animal, I fancy a Mastodon". On 26 January, they entered the Straits of Magellan, and at St. Gregory's Bay, they met half-civilised Patagonian "giants" over 6 ft (1.8 m) tall, described by Darwin as "excellent practical naturalists". One told him that the smaller rheas were the only species this far south, while the larger rheas kept to the north, the species meeting around the Rio Negro.

After further surveying in Tierra del Fuego, they returned on 5 March 1834 to visit the missionaries but found the huts deserted. Then canoes approached, and they found that one of the natives was Jemmy Button, who had lost his possessions and had settled into the native ways, taking a wife. Darwin had never seen "so complete & grievous a change". Jemmy came on board and dined using his cutlery properly, speaking English as well as ever, then assured them that he "had not the least wish to return to England" and was "happy and contented", leaving them gifts of otter skins and arrowheads before returning to the canoe to join his wife. Of the first visit, Darwin had written that "Viewing such men, one can hardly make oneself believe that they are fellow creatures placed in the same world. .... It is a common subject of conjecture; what pleasure in life some of the less gifted animals can enjoy? How much more reasonably it may be asked with respect to these men", yet Jemmy had readily adapted to civilisation and then chosen to return to his primitive ways. This raised awkward questions; it jarred with Charles Lyell's sheltered views, expressed in volume 2 of his Principles of Geology, that human races "showed only a slight deviation from a common standard", and that acceptance of transmutation meant renouncing man's "belief in the high genealogy of his species".

About this time Darwin wrote Reflection on Reading My Geological Notes, the first of a series of essays included in his notes. He speculated on possible causes of the land repeatedly being raised, and on a history of life in Patagonia as a sequence of named species.

They returned to the Falkland Islands on 16 March, just after an incident where gauchos and Indians had butchered senior members of Vernet's settlement, and helped to put the revolt down. Darwin noted the immense number of organisms dependent on the kelp forests. He received word from Henslow that his first dispatch of fossils had reached Cambridge, were highly prized by the expert William Clift as showing hitherto unknown species and features of the Megatherium, and had been displayed by William Buckland and Clift before the cream of British science, making Darwin's reputation.

Beagle now sailed to southern Patagonia, and on 19 April, an expedition including FitzRoy and Darwin set off to take boats as far as possible up the Santa Cruz river, with all involved taking turns in teams dragging the boats upstream. The river cut through a series of rises, then through plateaux forming wide plains covered with shells and shingle. Darwin discussed with FitzRoy his interpretation that these terraces had been shores that had gradually raised per Lyell's theories. Several of the smaller rheas were seen in the distance but were too elusive to catch. The expedition approached the Andes but had to turn back.

Darwin summarised his speculation in his essay on the Elevation of Patagonia. Though tentative, it challenged Lyell's ideas. Darwin drew on measurements by Beagle's officers, as well as his own measurements, to propose that the plains had been raised in successive stages by forces acting over a wide area, rather than smaller-scale actions in a continuous movement. However, he supported Lyell in finding evidence to dismiss a sudden deluge when normal processes were suddenly speeded. Seashells he had found far inland still showing their colour suggested to him that the process had been relatively recent and could have affected human history.

==== West coast of South America ====
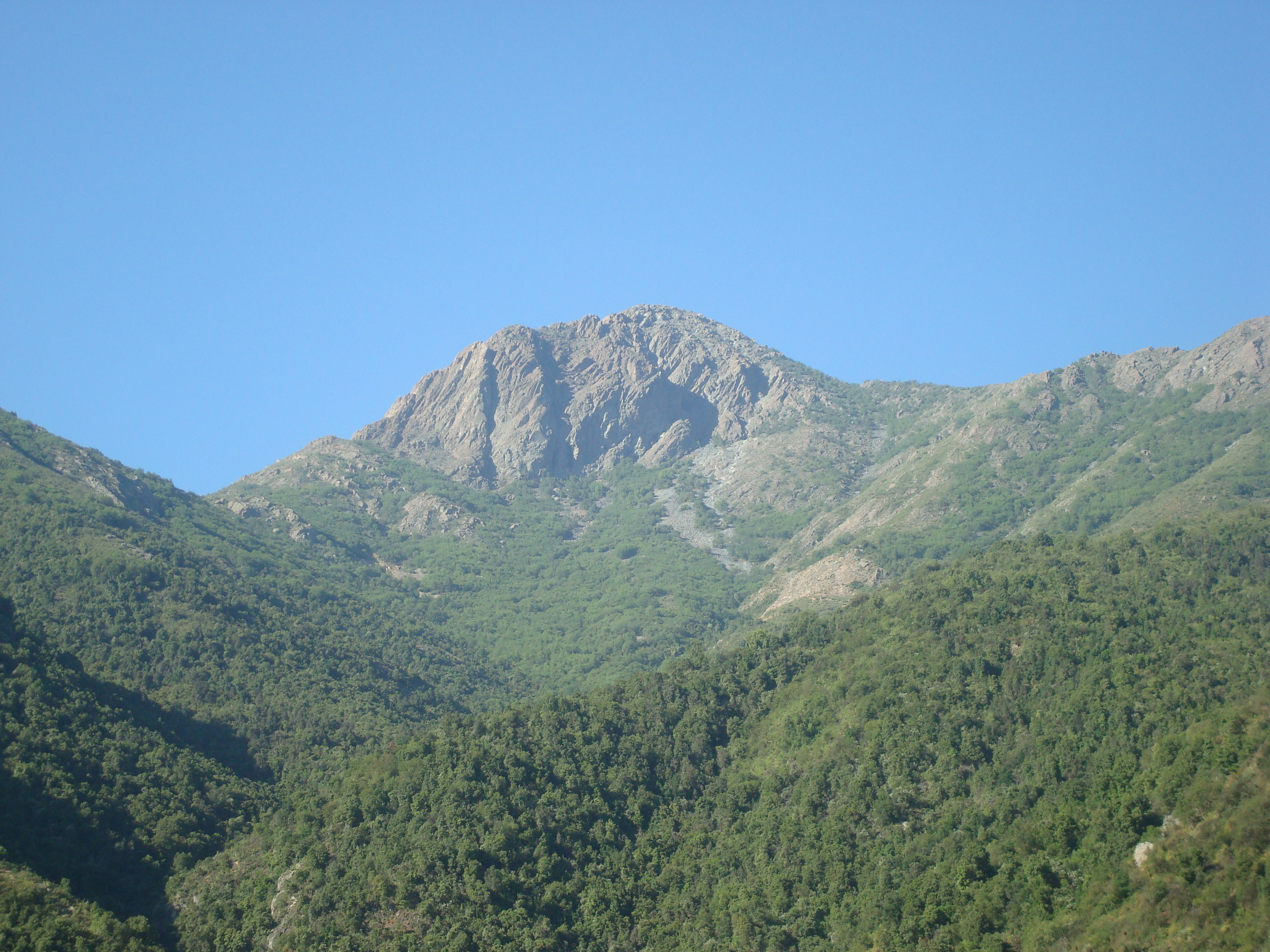
Cerro La Campana ("The Bell Mountain"), which Darwin ascended on 17 August 1834

Beagle and Adventure now surveyed the Straits of Magellan before sailing north up the west coast, reaching Chiloé Island in the wet and heavily wooded Chiloé Archipelago on 28 June 1834. They then spent the next six months surveying the coast and islands southwards. (Note: FitzRoy's and Darwin's publications arising from the expedition were a major reference point for 19th-century Chilean explorers of western Patagonia. FitzRoy's book Sailing Directions for South America led Chilean Navy hydrographer Francisco Hudson to investigate in the 1850s the possible existence of a sailing route through internal waters from the Chiloé Archipelago to the Straits of Magellan. Hudson was the first to realise that the Isthmus of Ofqui made this route impossible. Enrique Simpson found instead FitzRoy's mapping of little use noting in 1870 that "Fitzroy's chart, that is quite exact until that point [Melinka 43°53' S], is worthless further ahead...". Thus, south of Melinka Simpson relied more on the late 18th century sketches of José de Moraleda y Montero. Simpson's contemporary Francisco Vidal Gormaz was critical of the over-all work of FitzRoy and Darwin stating that they had failed to acknowledge the importance of the Patagonian islands.) On Chiloé, Darwin found fragments of black lignite and petrified wood, at least two of which the British Geological Survey discovered in 2011 locked away in their collection labelled "unregistered fossil plants". Exchanged with Joseph Dalton Hooker about ten years later, one slide was signed "Chiloe, C. Darwin Esq".

They arrived at Valparaíso on 23 July, and Darwin "got scent of some fossil bones .... if gold or galloping will get them, they shall be mine." After several walks in the area, he obtained horses and, on 14 August, set off up the volcanic Andes with a companion. Three days later they spent an enjoyable day on the summit of the "Campana or Bell" mountain, Cerro La Campana. Darwin visited a copper mine and spent five days scrambling in the mountains before going on to Santiago, Chile. On his way back, he fell ill on 20 September and had to spend a month in bed. It is possible that he contracted Chagas' disease here, leading to his health problems after his return to England, but this diagnosis of his symptoms is disputed. He learnt that the Admiralty had reprimanded FitzRoy for buying Adventure. FitzRoy had taken it badly, selling the ship and announcing they would go back to recheck his survey. He then had resigned his command, doubting his sanity, but was persuaded by his officers to withdraw his resignation and proceed. The artist Conrad Martens left the ship and took passage to Australia.

After waiting for Darwin, Beagle sailed on 11 November to survey the Chonos Archipelago. From here, they saw the eruption of the volcano Osorno in the Andes. They sailed north, and Darwin wondered about the fossils he had found. The giant Mastodons and Megatheriums were extinct, but he had found no geological signs of a "diluvial debacle" or of the changed circumstances that, in Lyell's view, led to species no longer being adapted to the position they were created to fit. He agreed with Lyell's idea of "the gradual birth & death of species", but, unlike Lyell, Darwin was willing to believe Giovanni Battista Brocchi's idea that extinct species had somehow aged and died out.

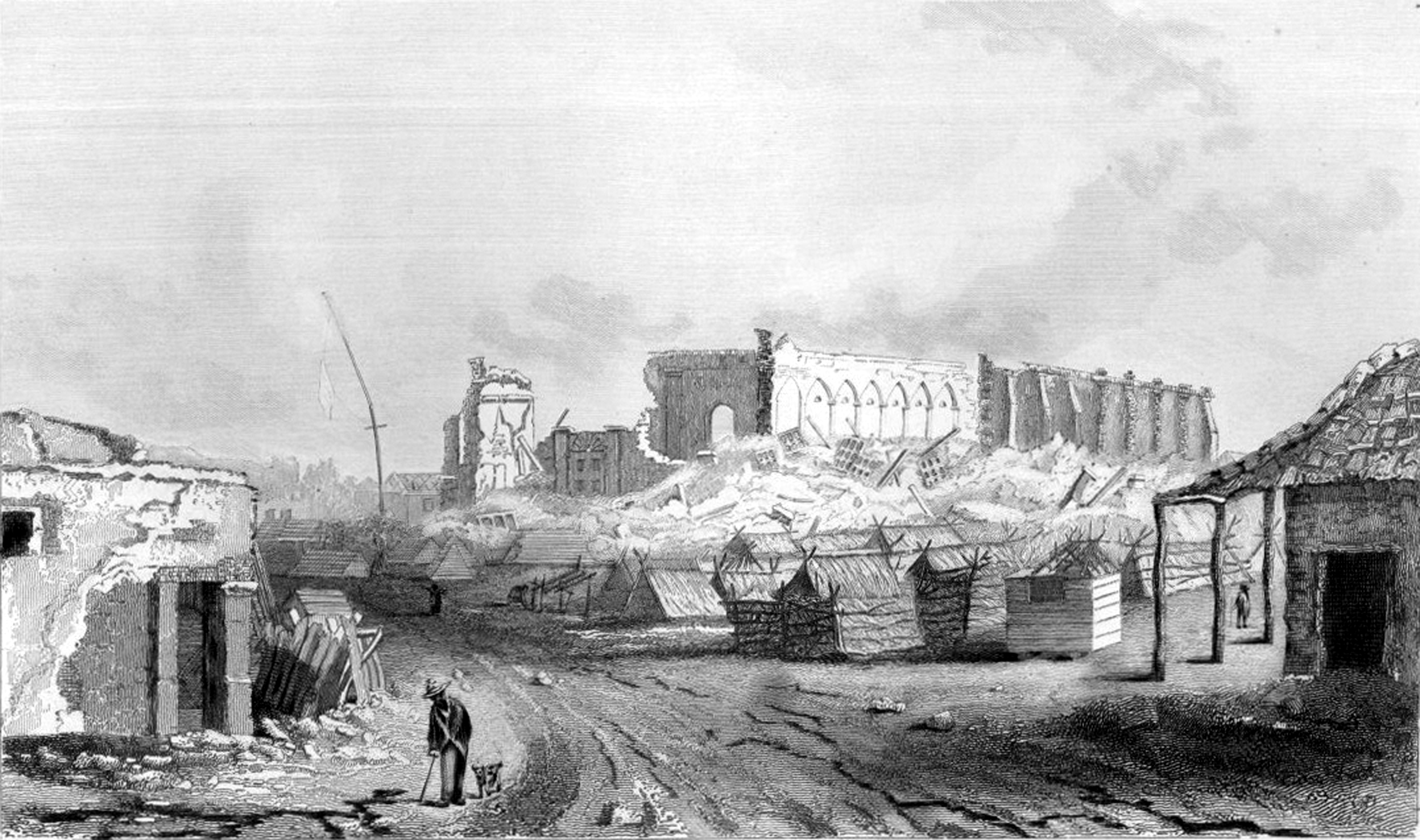
Concepción in Chile after the earthquake, as drawn by Lieutenant John Clements Wickham of HMS Beagle

They arrived at the port of Valdivia on 8 February 1835. Twelve days later, Darwin was on shore when he experienced a severe earthquake and returned to find the port town badly damaged. They sailed two hundred miles (320 km) north to Concepción, and arrived on 4 March to find that the same earthquake had devastated the city by repeated shocks and a tsunami, with even the cathedral in ruins. Darwin noted the horrors of death and destruction, and FitzRoy carefully established that mussel beds were now above high tide, giving clear evidence of the ground rising some 9 ft (2.7 m), which he confirmed a month later. They had actually experienced the gradual process of the continent emerging from the ocean, as Lyell had indicated.

They returned to Valparaiso on 11 March, Darwin set out on another trek up the Andes three days later and, on 21 March, reached the continental divide at 13,000 ft (4,000 m): even here, he found fossil seashells in the rocks. He felt the glorious view "was like watching a thunderstorm, or hearing in the full Orchestra a Chorus of the Messiah." After going on to Mendoza, they were returning by a different pass when they found a petrified forest of fossilised trees, crystallised in a sandstone escarpment showing him that they had been on a Pacific beach when the land sank, burying them in the sand which had been compressed into rock, then had gradually been raised with the continent to stand at 7,000 ft (2,100 m) in the mountains. On returning to Valparaiso with half a mule's load of specimens, he wrote to his family on 23 April that his findings, if accepted, would be crucial to the theory of the formation of the world. After another gruelling expedition in the Andes, while Beagle was refitted, he rejoined it at Copiapó on 5 July and sailed to Lima but found an armed insurrection in progress and had to stay with the ship. Here he was writing up his notes when he realised that Lyell's idea, that coral atolls were on the rims of rising extinct volcanoes, made less sense than the volcanoes gradually sinking so that the coral reefs around the island kept building themselves close to sea level and became an atoll as the volcano disappeared below. This was a theory he would examine when they reached such islands.

On 14 June, when about to leave Valparaiso, FitzRoy had received news of the shipwreck of HMS Challenger captained by his friend Michael Seymour (Darwin had arranged two boxes for this packet ship early in the year). On investigation, FitzRoy found that Commodore Mason was unwilling to take HMS Blonde to the rescue for fear of lee-shore hazards, so FitzRoy "had to bully him & at last offered to go as Pilot". After "a tremendous quarrel" with hints to the Commodore of court-martial, they took Blonde to Concepción. FitzRoy rode about 64 kilometres (40 mi) on horseback with a guide to reach Seymour's camp at the Lebu River, then returned to further disputes before Blonde set out and rescued the survivors of the shipwreck on 5 July. Wickham took Beagle on to reach Copiapó on 3 July, two days before Darwin rejoined the ship and they continued on to Lima. On 9 September Blonde brought FitzRoy to join them at Lima.

=== Galápagos Islands ===
A week out of Lima, Beagle reached the Galápagos Islands on 15 September 1835. The next day Captain FitzRoy dropped anchor near where the town of Puerto Baquerizo Moreno is now sited, at Chatham Island. At the location that is now known as Frigatebird Hill (Cerro Tijeretas), Darwin spent his first hour onshore in the Galapagos islands.

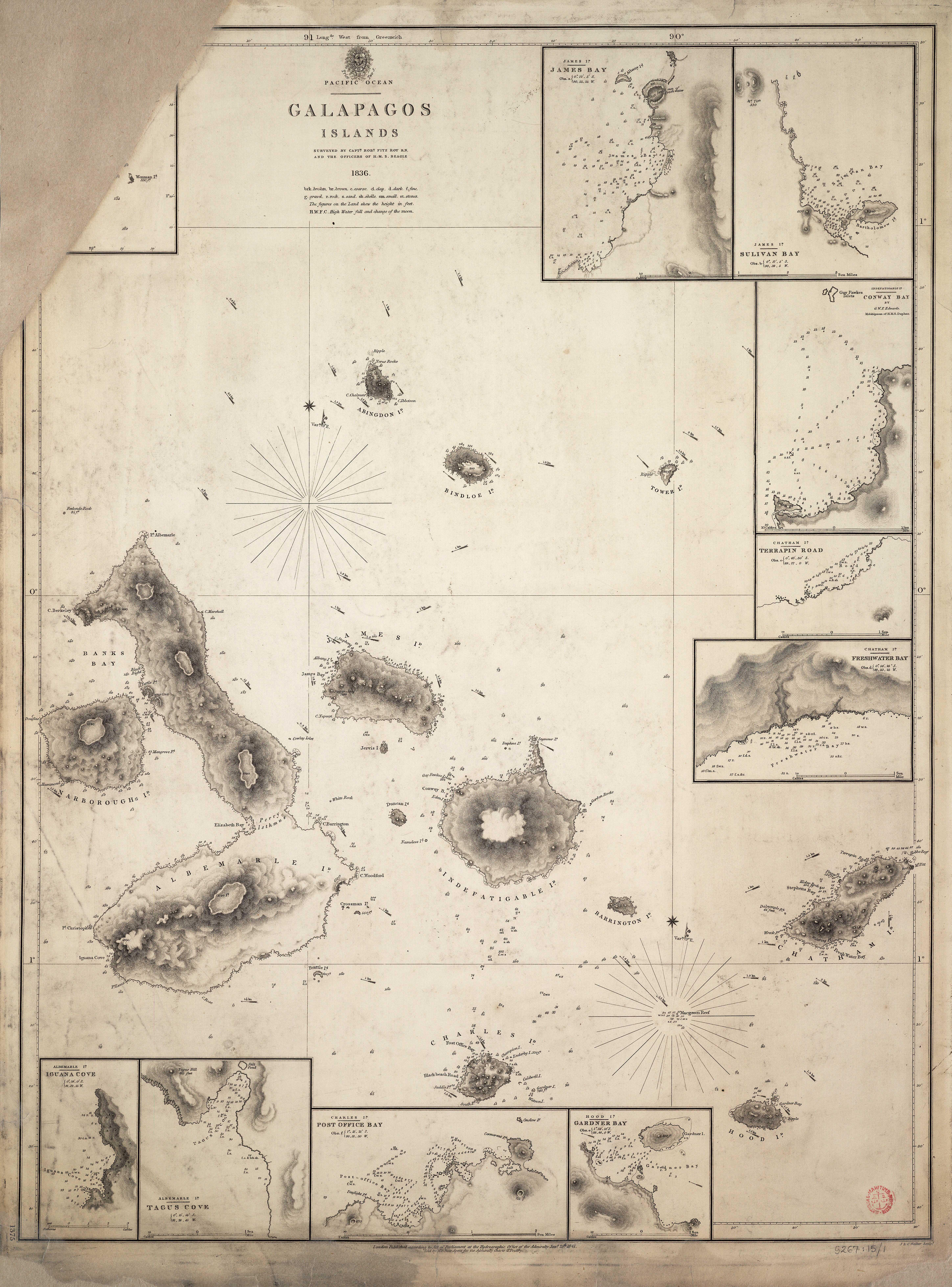
Admiralty Chart of the Galápagos Islands, surveyed in 1836

Darwin eagerly looked forward to seeing newly formed volcanic islands and took every opportunity to go ashore while Beagle was methodically moved round to chart the coast. He found broken black rocky volcanic lava scorching under the hot sun, and made detailed geological notes of features including volcanic cones like chimneys which reminded him of the iron foundries of industrial Staffordshire. He was disappointed that he did not see active volcanoes or find strata showing uplift as he had hoped, though one of the officers found broken oyster-shells high above the sea on one of the islands. Abundant giant Galápagos tortoises appeared to him almost antediluvian, and large black marine iguanas seemed "most disgusting, clumsy Lizards" well suited to their habitat—he noted that someone had called them "imps of darkness". Darwin had learnt from Henslow about studying the geographical distribution of species, and particularly of linked species on oceanic islands and nearby continents, so he endeavoured to collect plants in flower. He found widespread "wretched-looking" thin scrub thickets of only ten species and very few insects. Birds were remarkably unafraid of humans, and in his first field note, he recorded that a mockingbird was similar to those he had seen on the continent.

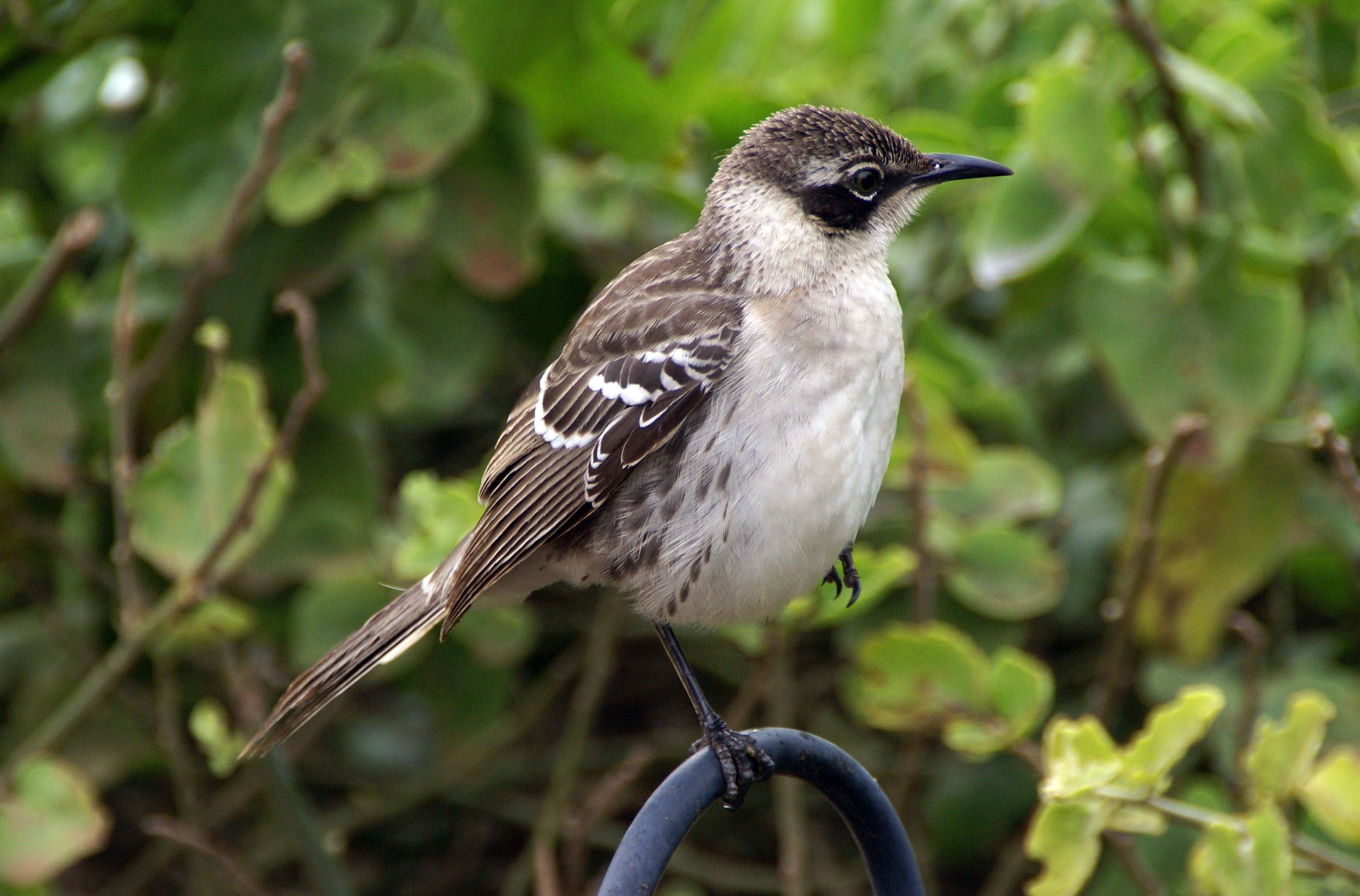
The various Galápagos mockingbirds Darwin caught resembled the Chilean mockingbird Mimus thenka, but differed from island to island.

Beagle sailed on to Charles Island. By chance, they were greeted by the "Englishman" Nicholas Lawson, acting Governor of Galápagos for the Republic of the Equator, who accompanied them up to the penal colony. It was said that tortoises differed in the shape of the shells from island to island, and Darwin noted Lawson's statement that on seeing a tortoise, he could "pronounce with certainty from which island it has been brought". Though Darwin remembered this later, he did not pay much attention at the time. However, he found a mockingbird and "fortunately happened to observe" that it differed from the Chatham Island specimen, so from then on, he carefully noted where mockingbirds had been caught. He industriously collected all the animals, plants, insects and reptiles, and speculated about finding "from future comparison to what district or 'centre of creation' the organized beings of this archipelago must be attached." At this stage, his thoughts reflected Lyell's rejection of transmutation of species.

They went on to Albemarle Island, where Darwin saw a small jet of smoke from a recently active volcano. On 1 October, he landed near Tagus Cove and explored Beagle Crater. There, he saw his first Galapagos land iguanas. Water pits were disappointingly inadequate for drinking, but attracted swarms of small birds, and Darwin made his only note of the finches he was not bothering to label by island. He caught a third species of mockingbird.

After passing the northern islands of Abingdon, Tower and Bindloe, Darwin was put ashore at James Island for nine days together with the surgeon Benjamin Bynoe and their servants. They busily collected all sorts of specimens while Beagle went back to Chatham Island for freshwater.

After further surveying, Beagle set sail for Tahiti on 20 October 1835. Darwin wrote up his notes, and to his astonishment, found that all the mockingbirds caught on Charles, Albemarle, James and Chatham Islands differed from island to island. He wrote "This birds which is so closely allied to the Thenca of Chili (Callandra of B. Ayres) is singular from existing as varieties or distinct species in the different Isds.— I have four specimens from as many Isds.— These will be found to be 2 or 3 varieties.— Each variety is constant in its own Island....".

=== Tahiti to Australia ===
They sailed on, dining on Galapagos tortoises, and passed the atoll of Honden Island on 9 November. They passed through the Low Islands archipelago, with Darwin remarking that they had "a very uninteresting appearance; a long brilliantly white beach is capped by a low bright line of green vegetation." Arriving at Tahiti on 15 November, he soon found interest in luxuriant vegetation and the pleasant intelligent natives who showed the benefits of Christianity, refuting allegations he had read about tyrannical missionaries overturning indigenous cultures.

On 19 December, they reached New Zealand, where Darwin thought the tattooed Māori to be savages with the character of a much lower order than the Tahitians. He also noted that they and their homes were "filthily dirty and offensive". Darwin saw missionaries bringing improvement in character, as well as new farming practices with an exemplary "English farm" employing natives. Richard Matthews was left here with his elder brother Joseph Matthews who was a missionary at Kaitaia. Darwin and FitzRoy agreed that missionaries had been unfairly misrepresented in tracts, particularly one written by the artist Augustus Earle which he had left on the ship. Darwin also noted many English residents of the most worthless character, including runaway convicts from New South Wales. By 30 December, he was glad to leave New Zealand.

The first sight of Australia on 12 January 1836 reminded him of Patagonia, but inland the country improved, and he was soon filled with admiration at the bustling city of Sydney. On a journey into the interior, he came across a group of Aboriginal peoples who looked "good-humoured & pleasant & they appeared far from such utterly degraded beings as usually represented". They gave him a display of spear throwing for a shilling, and he reflected sadly on how their numbers were rapidly decreasing. At a large sheep farm, he joined a hunting party and caught his first marsupial, a "potoroo" (rat-kangaroo). Reflecting on the strange animals of the country, he thought that an unbeliever "might exclaim 'Surely two distinct Creators must have been [at] work; their object however has been the same & certainly the end in each case is complete'," yet an antlion he was watching was very similar to its European counterpart. That evening he saw the even stranger platypus and noticed that its bill was soft, unlike the preserved specimens he had seen. Aboriginal stories that they laid eggs were believed by few Europeans.

Beagle visited Hobart, Tasmania, where Darwin was impressed by the agreeable high society of the settlers but noted that the island's "Aboriginal blacks are all removed & kept (in reality as prisoners) in a Promontory, the neck of which is guarded. I believe it was not possible to avoid this cruel step; although without doubt the misconduct of the Whites first led to the Necessity." They then sailed to King George's Sound in south-west Australia, a dismal settlement then being replaced by the Swan River Colony. Darwin was impressed by the "good disposition of the aboriginal blacks... Although true Savages, it is impossible not to feel an inclination to like such quiet good-natured men." He provided boiled rice for an aboriginal "Corrobery" dancing party performed by the men of two tribes to the great pleasure of the women and children, a "most rude barbarous scene" in which everyone appeared in high spirits, "all moving in hideous harmony" and "perfectly at their ease". Beagle's departure in a storm was delayed when she ran aground. She was refloated and got on her way.

=== Keeling Island homewards ===
FitzRoy's instructions from the Admiralty required a detailed geological survey of a circular coral atoll to investigate how coral reefs formed, particularly whether they rose from the bottom of the sea or the summits of extinct volcanoes, and the effects of tides measured with specially constructed gauges. He chose the Keeling Islands in the Indian Ocean, and on arrival on 1 April, the entire crew set to work. Darwin found a coconut economy, serving both the small settlement and wildlife. There was a limited range of native plants and no land birds, but hermit crabs everywhere. The lagoons teemed with a wide variety of invertebrates and fish, and he examined the atoll's structure in view of the theory he had developed in Lima, of encircling reefs becoming atolls as an island sank. This idea was supported by the numerous soundings FitzRoy had taken, showing a steep slope outside the reef with no living corals below 20–30 fathoms (40–60 m).

Arriving at Mauritius on 29 April 1836, Darwin was impressed by the civilised prosperity of the French colony, which had come under British rule. He toured the island, examining its volcanic mountains and fringing coral reefs. The Surveyor-general Captain Lloyd took him on the only elephant on the island to see an elevated coral plain. By then, FitzRoy was writing the official Narrative of the Beagle voyages, and after reading Darwin's diary he proposed a joint publication. Darwin asked his family about FitzRoy's idea "to have the disposal & arranging of my journal & to mingle it with his own".

Beagle reached the Cape of Good Hope on 31 May. In Cape Town, Darwin received a letter dated 29 January from his sister Catherine which briefly mentioned "the little books, with the Extracts from your Letters; every body is much pleased, with them, who has seen them". Darwin was horrified that his careless words were in print, but No hay remedio (it can't be helped). Unknown to Darwin, his fame was spreading; extracts from his letters to Henslow had been read to the Cambridge Philosophical Society on 16 November 1835 by Henslow and Sedgwick. On 18 November, Sedgwick had read extracts to the Geological Society of London, and this had been reported in The Athenæum on 21 November. On 25 December, their father received a letter from Henslow which said that Darwin would become one of the premier naturalists of the time and enclosed some copies of the pamphlet Extracts from letters addressed to Professor Henslow which had been printed for private distribution. Their father "did not move from his seat till he had read every word of your book & he was very much gratified – he liked so much the simple clear way you gave your information".

Darwin explored the geology of the area, reaching conclusions about the slate formation and the injection of granite seams as a liquid which differed from the ideas of Lyell and Sedgwick. The zoologist Andrew Smith showed him formations, and later discussed the large animals living on sparse vegetation, showing that a lack of luxuriant vegetation did not explain the extinction of the giant creatures in South America.

Around 15 June, Darwin and FitzRoy visited the noted astronomer Sir John Herschel. In his diary, Darwin called this "the most memorable event which, for a long period, I have had the good fortune to enjoy." His zeal for science had been stirred at Cambridge by reading Herschel's book on philosophy of science, which had guided his theorising during the voyage. Their discussion is not recorded, but a few months earlier, on 20 February 1836, Herschel had written to Lyell praising his Principles of Geology as a work which would bring "a complete revolution in [its] subject, by altering entirely the point of view in which it must thenceforward be contemplated." and opening a way for bold speculation on "that mystery of mysteries, the replacement of extinct species by others." Herschel himself thought catastrophic extinction and renewal "an inadequate conception of the Creator", and by analogy with other intermediate causes "the origination of fresh species, could it ever come under our cognizance, would be found to be a natural in contradistinction to a miraculous process".

In Cape Town, missionaries were being accused of causing racial tension and profiteering, and after Beagle set to sea on 18 June, FitzRoy wrote an open letter to the evangelical South African Christian Recorder on the Moral State of Tahiti incorporating extracts from both his and Darwin's diaries to defend the reputation of missionaries. This was given to a passing ship that took it to Cape Town to become FitzRoy's (and Darwin's) first published work.

On 8 July, they stopped at St. Helena for six days. Darwin took lodgings near Napoleon's tomb, and when writing to Henslow asking to be proposed for the Geological Society, he mentioned his suspicions "that differently from most Volcanic Islds. its structure is rather complicated. It seems strange, that this little centre of a distinct creation should, as is asserted, bear marks of recent elevation." With a guide, he wandered over the island, noting its complex sloping strata showing fault lines, interlaced with volcanic dykes. He examined beds high on the hill that had been taken as seashells showing that St. Helena had risen from the ocean in recent times, but Darwin identified them as extinct species of land-shells. He noted that woodland had been destroyed by goats and hogs that had run wild since being introduced in 1502, and native vegetation only predominated on high steep ridges, having been replaced by imported species.

At this stage, Darwin had an acute interest in the island biogeography, and his description of St Helena as "a little centre of creation" in his geological diary reflects Charles Lyell's speculation in volume 2 of Principles of Geology that the island would have acted as a "focus of creative force". He later recalled believing in the permanence of species, but "as far as I can remember, vague doubts occasionally flitted across my mind". When organising his Ornithological Notes between mid June and August, Darwin expanded on his initial notes on the Galapagos mockingbird Mimus thenca:

These birds are closely allied in appearance to the Thenca of Chile or Callandra of la Plata. ... In each Isld. each kind is exclusively found: habits of all are indistinguishable. When I recollect, the fact that the form of the body, shape of scales & general size, the Spaniards can at once pronounce, from which Island any Tortoise may have been brought. When I see these Islands in sight of each other, & [but del.] possessed of but a scanty stock of animals, tenanted by these birds, but slightly differing in structure & filling the same place in Nature, I must suspect they are only varieties.

The only fact of a similar kind of which I am aware, is the constant asserted difference – between the wolf-like Fox of East & West Falkland Islds.

If there is the slightest foundation for these remarks the zoology of Archipelagoes – will be well worth examining; for such facts [would inserted] undermine the stability of Species.

The term "would" before "undermine" had been added after writing what is now noted as the first expression of his doubts about species being immutable. That led to him becoming convinced about the transmutation of species and hence evolution. In opposing transmutation, Lyell had proposed that varieties arose due to changes in the environment, but these varieties lived in similar conditions though each on its own island. Darwin had just reviewed similar inconsistencies with mainland bird genera such as Pteroptochos. Though his suspicions about the Falkland Island fox may have been unsupported, the differences in Galápagos tortoises between islands were remembered, and he later wrote that he had been greatly struck from around March 1836 by the character of South American fossils and species on the Galapagos Archipelago, noting "These facts origin (especially latter) of all my views".

Beagle reached Ascension Island on 19 July 1836, and Darwin was delighted to receive letters from his sisters with news that Sedgwick had written to Dr. Butler: "He is doing admirably in S. America, & has already sent home a Collection above all praise.— It was the best thing in the world for him that he went out on the Voyage of Discovery— There was some risk of his turning out an idle man: but his character will now be fixed, & if God spare his life, he will have a great name among the Naturalists of Europe." Darwin later recalled how he "clambered over the mountains... with a bounding step and made the volcanic rocks resound under my geological hammer!." He agreed with the saying attributed to the people of St Helena that "We know we live on a rock, but the poor people at Ascension live on a cinder", and noted the care taken to sustain "houses, gardens & fields placed near the summit of the central mountain". (In the 1840s, Darwin worked with Hooker, who proposed in 1847 that the Royal Navy shall import tree species, a project started in 1850 which led to the creation of an artificial cloud forest on what is now Green Mountain.)

On 23 July, they set off again longing to reach home, but FitzRoy, who wanted to ensure the accuracy of his longitude measurements, took the ship across the Atlantic back to Bahia in Brazil to take check readings. Darwin was glad to see the beauties of the jungle for one last time but now compared "the stately Mango trees with the Horse Chesnuts of England." The return trip was delayed for a further 11 days when weather forced Beagle to shelter further up the coast at Pernambuco, where Darwin examined rocks for signs of elevation, noted "Mangroves like rank grass", and investigated marine invertebrates at various depths on the sandbar. Beagle departed for home on 17 August. After a stormy passage including a stop for supplies at the Azores, the Beagle finally reached England on 2 October 1836 and anchored at Falmouth, Cornwall.

== Return ==
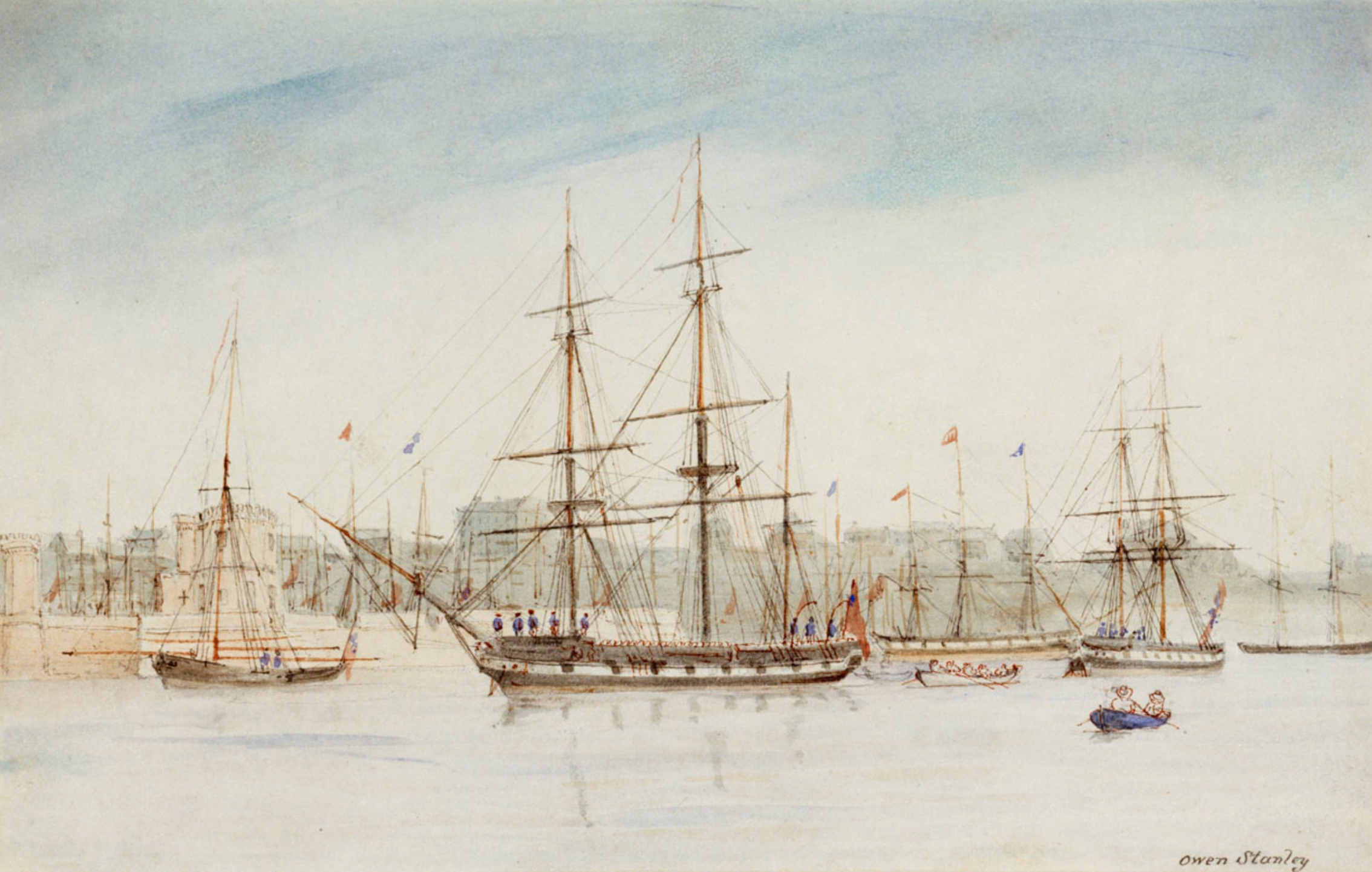
In 1837 HMS Beagle set off on a survey of Australia, shown here in an 1841 watercolour by Owen Stanley RN.

On the stormy night of 2 October 1836, immediately after arriving in Falmouth, Darwin set off on the Royal Mail coach from Fish Strand Hill (a plaque now marks the site) for the two-day journey to his family home, The Mount House in Shrewsbury, Shropshire. As he wrote to FitzRoy, the countryside they passed was "beautiful & cheerful", and though the "stupid people on the coach did not seem to think the fields one bit greener than usual", he now knew "that the wide world does not contain so happy a prospect as the rich cultivated land of England". In April 1835 Darwin had written that he was undecided whether to "sleep at the Lion, the first night," when he arrived by the daily Wonder coach, "or disturb you all in the dead of the night". He arrived late at night on 4 October 1836, and at breakfast the next morning greeted his family, to their delight and celebrations. His sisters assured him he did "not look the least different", but his father's first reaction was to tell them "Why, the shape of his head is quite altered." After time spent catching up with family, Darwin went on to Cambridge on 15 October and sought Henslow's advice on organising the description and cataloguing of his collections.

Darwin's father gave him an allowance that enabled him to put aside other careers. As a scientific celebrity with a reputation established by his fossils and the wide distribution of Extracts from Letters to Henslow on South American natural history and geology, Darwin toured London's social institutions. By this time, he was part of the "scientific establishment", collaborating with expert naturalists to describe his specimens and working on ideas he had been developing during the voyage. Charles Lyell gave him enthusiastic backing. In December 1836, Darwin presented a talk to the Cambridge Philosophical Society. He wrote a paper proving that Chile, and the South American continent, was slowly rising, which he read to the Geological Society of London on 4 January 1837.

Darwin was willing to have his diary published mixed in with FitzRoy's account, but his relatives, including Emma and Hensleigh Wedgwood, urged that it be published separately. On 30 December, the question was settled by FitzRoy taking the advice of William Broderip that Darwin's journal should form the third volume of the Narrative. Darwin set to work reorganising his diary, trimming it, and incorporating scientific material from his notes. He completed his Journal and Remarks (now commonly known as The Voyage of the Beagle) in August 1837, but FitzRoy was slower, and the three volumes were published in August 1839.

Syms Covington stayed with Darwin as his servant. Then, on 25 February 1839, (shortly after Darwin's marriage), Covington left on good terms and migrated to Australia.

== Expert publications on Darwin's collections ==
Darwin was a collector and used the reference books he had on the ship. It was now the province of recognised expert specialists to establish which specimens were unknown, and make their considered taxonomic decisions on defining and naming new species.

=== Fossils ===
Richard Owen had expertise in comparative anatomy, and his professional judgements revealed a succession of similar species in the same locality, giving Darwin insights which he would later recall as being central to his new views. Owen met Darwin on 29 October 1836 and quickly took on the task of describing these new fossils. At that time the only fully described fossil mammals from South America were three species of Mastodon and the gigantic Megatherium. On 9 November, Darwin wrote to his sister that "Some of them are turning out great treasures." The near-complete skeleton from Punta Alta was apparently very closely allied to anteaters, but of the extraordinary size of a small horse. The rhinoceros-sized head bought for two shillings near the city of Mercedes was not a megatherium, but "as far as they can guess, must have been a gnawing animal. Conceive a Rat or a Hare of such a size— What famous Cats they ought to have had in those days!"

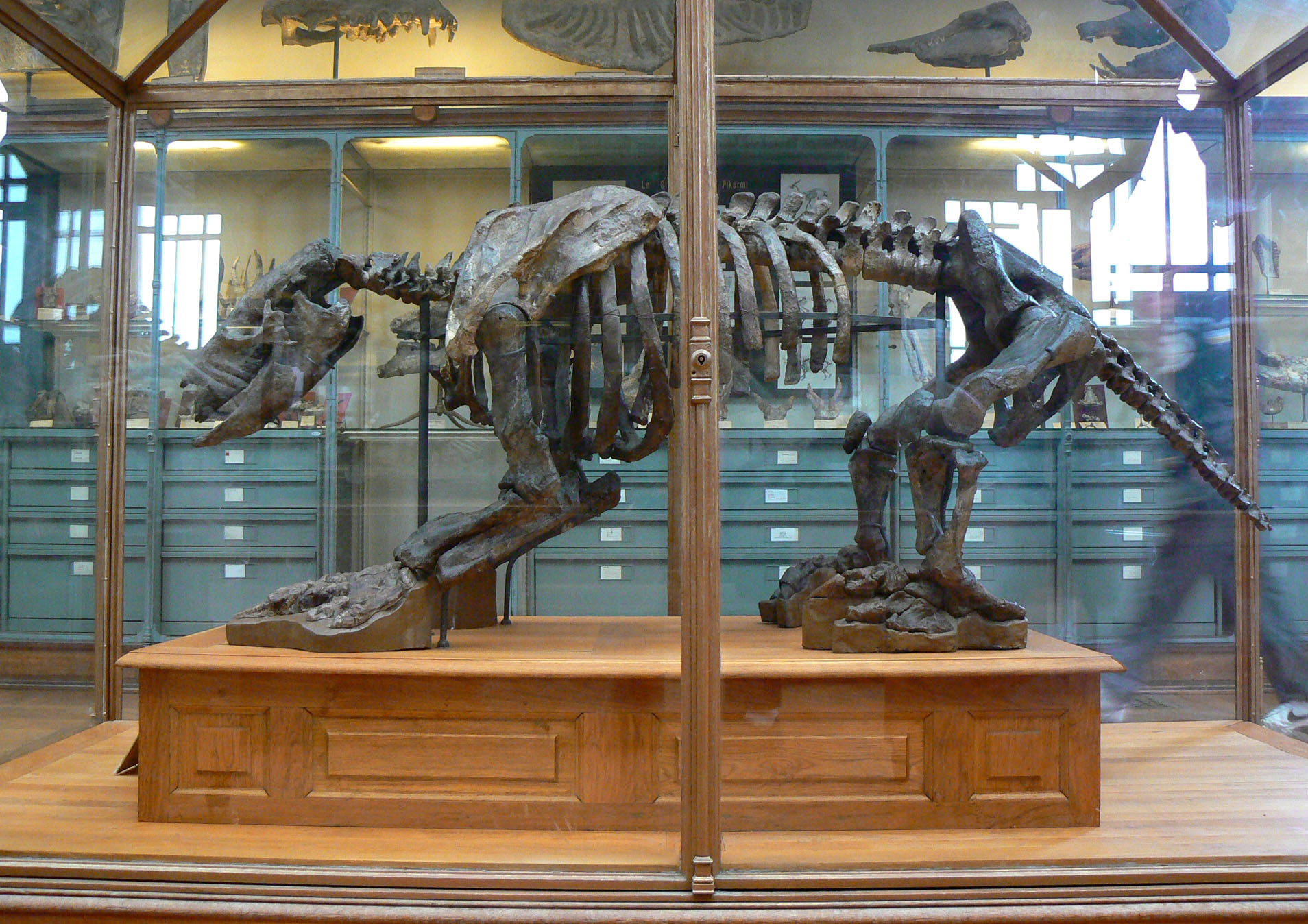
A Scelidotherium skeleton in Paris

Over the following years, Owen published descriptions of the most important fossils, naming several as new species. He described the fossils from Punta Alta as including a nearly perfect head and three fragments of heads of Megatherium Cuvierii, the jaw of a related species which Owen named Mylodon Darwinii, and jaws of Megalonyx Jeffersonii. The near-complete skeleton was named Scelidotherium by Owen, who found that it had most of its bones nearly in their proper relative positions. At the nearby Monte Hermoso beds, numerous rodents included species allied to the Brazilian tuco-tuco and the capybara.

Owen decided that the fossils of polygonal plates of bony armour found at several locations were not from the Megatherium as Cuvier's description implied, but from a huge armadillo, as Darwin had briefly thought. Owen found a description of an earlier unnamed specimen which he named Glyptodon clavipes in 1839. Darwin's find from Punta Alta, a large surface about 3 by 2 ft (0.91 by 0.61 m) doubled over with toe bones still inside the folded armour, was identified as a slightly smaller Glyptodont named Hoplophorus by Peter Wilhelm Lund in the same year.

The huge skull from near Mercedes was named Toxodon by Owen, and he showed that the "enormous gnawing tooth" from the cliffs of the Carcarañá River was a molar from this species. The finds near Mercedes also included a large fragment of Glyptodont armour and a head that Owen initially identified as a Glossotherium, but later decided was a Mylodon. Owen found fragments of the jaw and a tooth of another Toxodon in the fossils from Punta Alta.

The fossils from near Santa Fe included the horse tooth which had puzzled Darwin as it had been previously thought that horses had only come to the Americas in the 16th century, close to a Toxodon tooth and a tooth of Mastodon andium (now Cuvieronius hyodon). Owen confirmed that the horse tooth was of an extinct South American species which he named Equus curvidens, and its age was confirmed by a corroded horse tooth among the Punta Alta fossils. This discovery was later explained as part of the evolution of the horse.

The "soft as cheese" Mastodon bones at the Paraná River were identified as two gigantic skeletons of Mastodon andium, and mastodon teeth were also identified from Santa Fe and the Carcarañá River. The pieces of spine and a hind leg from Port S. Julian, which Darwin had thought came from "some large animal, I fancy a Mastodon", gave Owen difficulties, as the creature which he named Macrauchenia appeared to be a "gigantic and most extraordinary pachyderm", allied to the Palaeotherium, but with affinities to the llama and the camel. The fossils at Punta Alta included a pachyderm tooth which was thought probably came from Macrauchenia.
