= Cambridge Philosophical Society =

Scientific society, founded in 1819

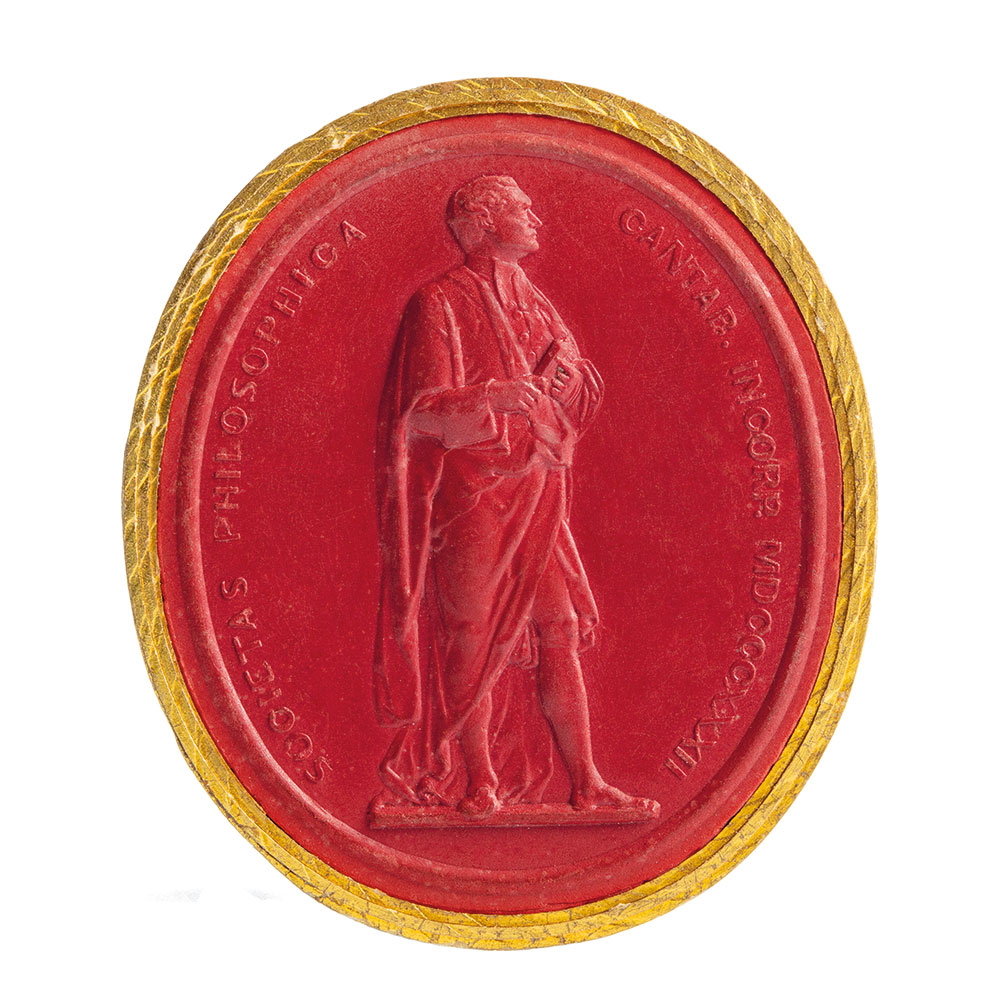
- The Cambridge Philosophical Society Wax Seal, 1832.
- Formation: 1819; 207 years ago
- Type: Scientific Society
- Registration no.: 213811
- Legal status: Royal Charter, granted by King William IV in 1832
- Purpose: for the purpose of promoting scientific inquiry
- Headquarters: 17 Mill Lane, Cambridge, CB2 1RX; United Kingdom
- Members: Honorary Members and Fellows
- President: Professor John Carr
- Main organ: The Council
- Website: www.cambridgephilosophicalsociety.org
- Remarks: keep alive the spirit of inquiry

The Cambridge Philosophical Society (CPS) is a scientific society at the University of Cambridge. It was founded in 1819. The name derives from the medieval use of the word philosophy to denote any research undertaken outside the fields of law, theology and medicine. The society was granted a royal charter by King William IV in 1832. The society is governed by an elected council of senior academics, which is chaired by the Society's President, according to a set of statutes.

The society has published several scientific journals, including Biological Reviews (established 1926) and Mathematical Proceedings of the Cambridge Philosophical Society (formerly entitled Proceedings of the Cambridge Philosophical Society, published since 1843). Transactions of the Cambridge Philosophical Society was published between 1821–1928, but was then discontinued.

== History ==
The society was founded in 1819 by John Stevens Henslow, Adam Sedgwick and Edward Clarke, is Cambridge's oldest scientific society.

Its prime purpose is to "keep alive the spirit of inquiry". For over 200 years, this spirit has been kept alive by its members and its activities. The society is independent of the University of Cambridge, although its offices are located within the University of Cambridge estate in central Cambridge. The Society has provided an open forum and played a key role in raising the profile of the sciences to the public.

The society is a registered charity: 213811 and has 11 Trustees. It is assisted by a number of full-time and part-time paid staff. Membership of the Society is currently over 2,000.

== William Bate Hardy Prize and the William Hopkins Prize ==
The Society awards a number of prizes for new publications, inventions, investigations or discoveries in the fields of mathematics, physics and the natural sciences. Awards given are the William Bate Hardy Prize and The William Hopkins Prize.

The William Hopkins Prize was established in 1862 and is one of the oldest scientific prizes at the University of Cambridge. Past recipients of the prize include James Clerk Maxwell, Lord Rayleigh, Sir G. G. Stokes, Sir J. D. Cockcroft, Sir A. S. Eddington, Paul Dirac and Stephen Hawking.

== Fellow of the Cambridge Philosophical Society (F.C.P.S.) ==
Members of the Society are called Fellows and are entitled to use the ‘FCPS’ post-nominals. Fellows are usually academics or graduate students involved in mathematical or scientific research within the university. A Fellow must be recommended in writing by both a Fellow of the Society who has been a member for at least three years and a person of appropriate standing, who knows the candidate in a professional capacity. Approved candidates are elected at open meetings of the Society following proposal at Council Meetings.

== Journals ==
The society publishes one of the oldest mathematical journals in history: "Mathematical Proceedings" first published in 1843 and now published for Cambridge Philosophical Society by Cambridge University Press. It has also published "Biological Reviews" since 1926.

== Lectures ==
The society organizes lectures given by prominent scientists and mathematicians. The lectures are free and open to all who are interested to attend.

== Nobel laureates ==
The Society has had numerous Fellows and Honorary Fellows who have been awarded the Nobel Prize. The first two recipients were Honorary Fellows Hendrik A Lorentz and Pieter Zeeman in 1902 for the Nobel Prize in Physics. The Society's first women winner was Honorary Fellow Marie Curie in 1903 for the Nobel Prize in Physics. Marie Curie was the first person to win or share two Nobel Prizes, being awarded the Nobel Prize in Chemistry in 1911.

In 1964, Dorothy Hodgkin became not only the first female Fellow of the Society to win a Nobel Prize (Chemistry) but also the first female member of the University of Cambridge to do so.

Currently 52 Nobel Prize winners are listed amongst its Fellows and Honorary Fellows of the Cambridge Philosophical Society.

== Notable Fellows ==
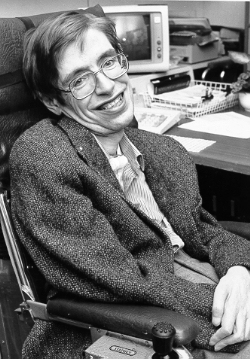
Stephen Hawking was elected a Fellow of the Society in 1970 until his death in 2018.

- James Clerk Maxwell
- Charles Babbage
- Sir George Gabriel Stokes
- John William Strutt, 3rd Baron Rayleigh
- Sir George Darwin
- James Clerk Maxwell
- Lawrence Bragg
- Francis Crick
- Paul Dirac
- Jamal Nazrul Islam
- Stephen Hawking
- John Stevens Henslow
- Antony Hewish
- Dorothy Hodgkin
- Roger Penrose
- Lord Rayleigh
- Ernest Rutherford
- Abdus Salam
- Adam Sedgwick
- J.J. Thomson
- Alan Turing
- Martin Rees

== Blue Plaque ==
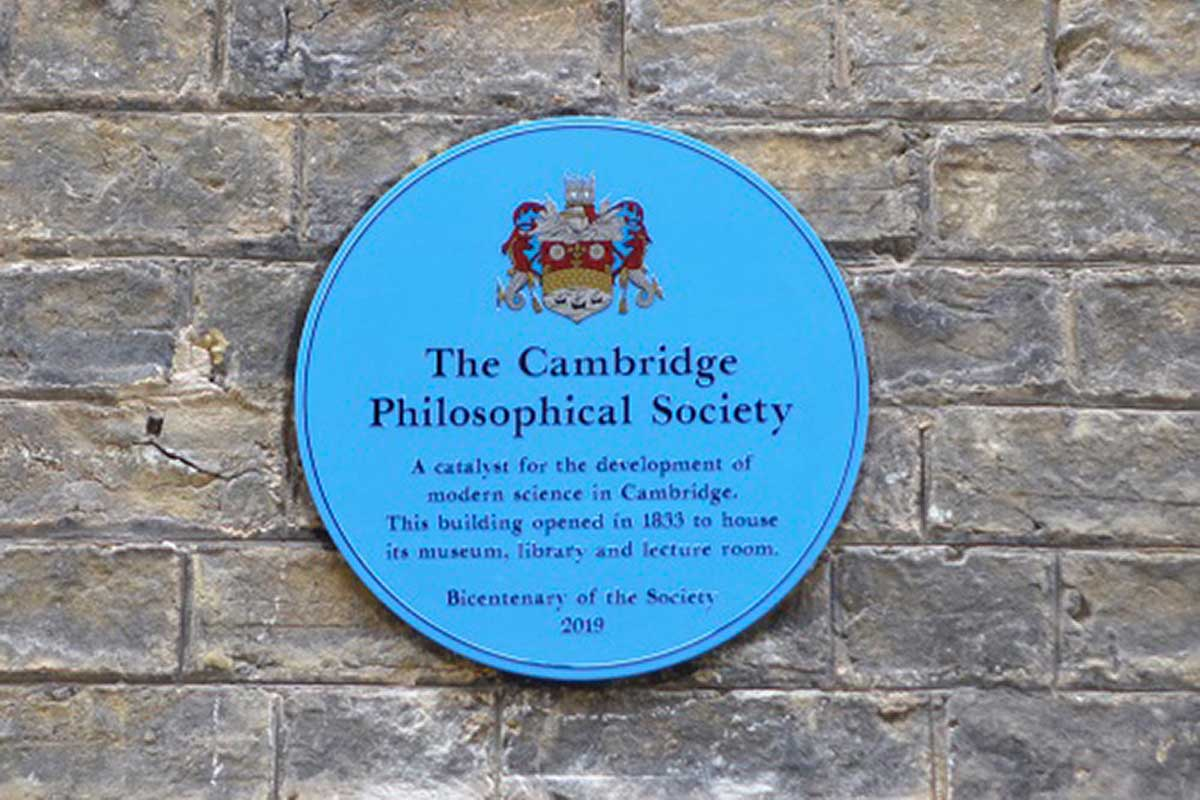
The Society’s bicentenary blue plaque on 2 All Saints Passage, Cambridge.

To commemorate the Society’s bicentenary, a blue plaque to the Society was erected in March 2019 on 2 All Saints Passage (the house built by the Society in 1833 to house its meeting room, library and collections). The plaque was unveiled by Sir Martin Rees at opening of the Society’s exhibition at Cambridge University Library.

== Society Archives ==
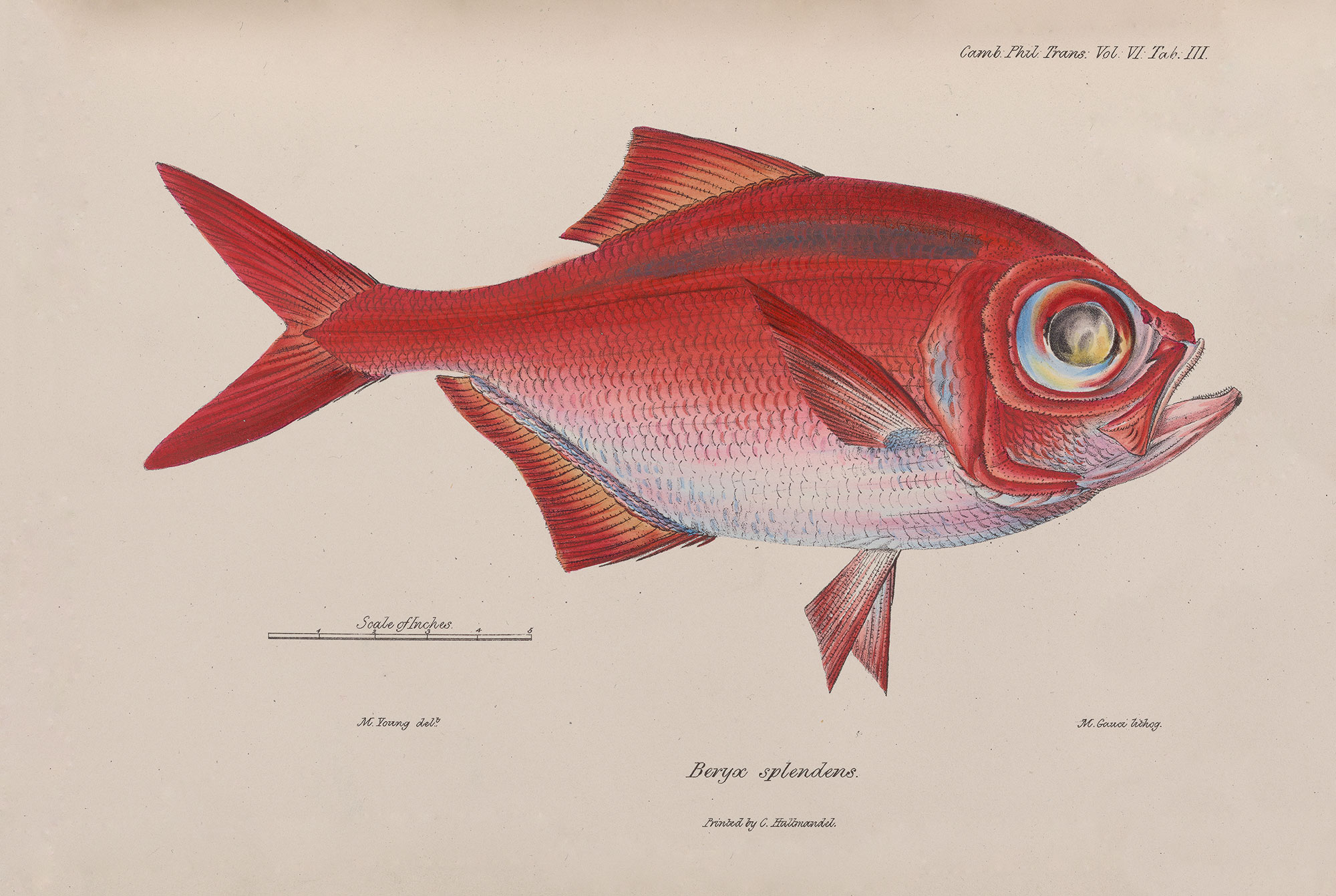
Coloured plate from R.T. Lowe 'On the Fishes of Madeira' from Transactions of the Cambridge Philosophical Society, Volume 6, 1838.

The society has built up an exceptional historical scientific record dating back to 1819. While not on public display, the archives can be viewed by prior arrangement with the Cambridge Philosophical Society.

The Society archives include the following:

- Minutes of Council and of General Meetings
- Membership and subscription records
- Archives relating to the various premises occupied by the Society
- Archives relating to the Society’s publications
- Archives of the Library and Reading Room predating 1976 (the date at which the Library, by then known as the Scientific Periodicals Library and later as the Central Science Library, became a dependent library of Cambridge University Library)
- Archives relating to events and activities
- Some archives of individual members, such as Sir Joseph Larmor (1857–1942, physicist and mathematician)

== Charles Darwin: Extracts from Letters to Henslow ==
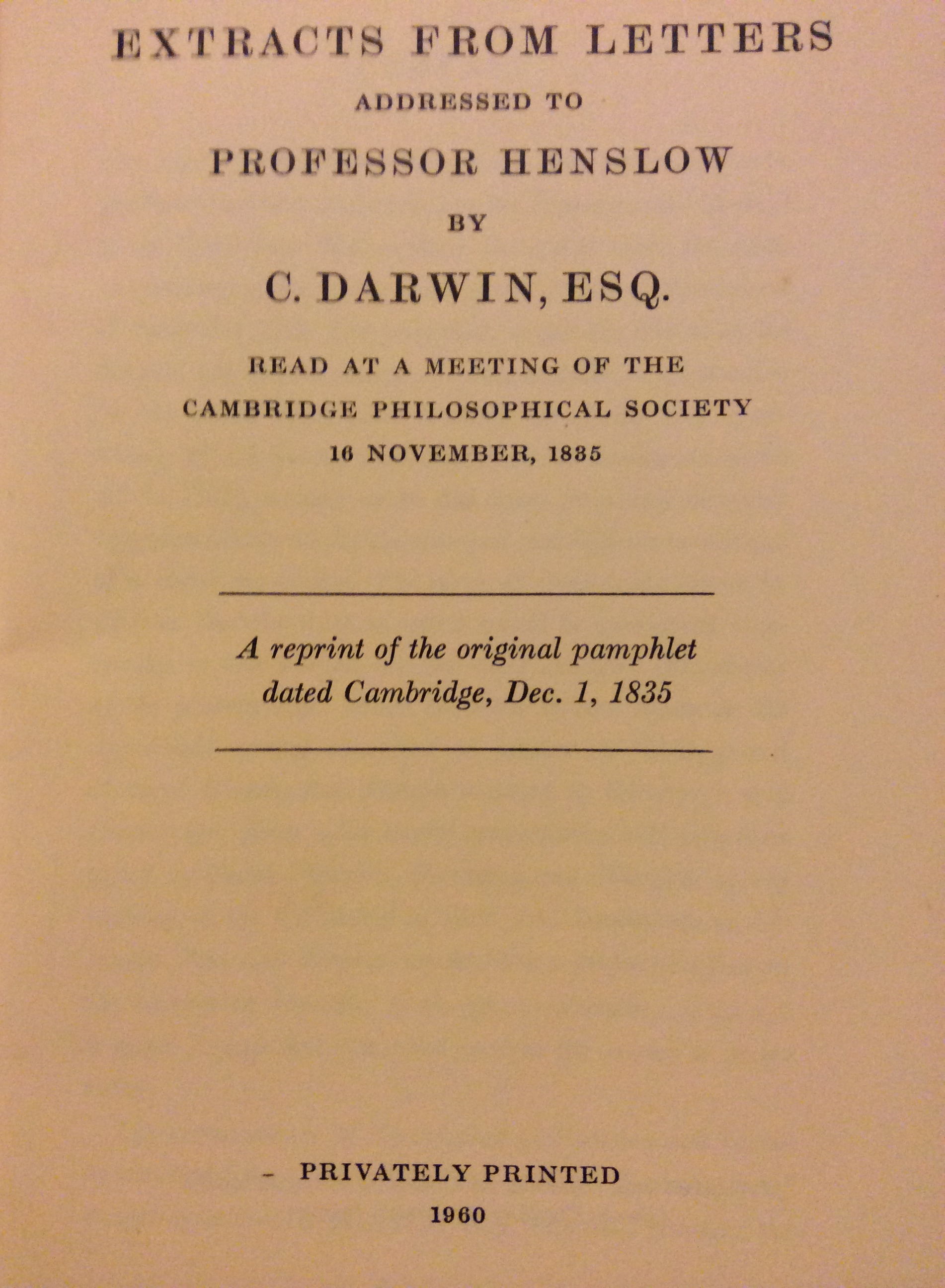
The front page of the 1960 reprint of Extracts from Letters to Henslow.

Charles Darwin, a student at Christ's College, University of Cambridge, came to know John Stevens Henslow as his tutor and through his attendance at Henslow's scientific talks at the university. Darwin had been recommended by Henslow to take his place aboard the survey ship HMS Beagle on a two-year voyage to survey South America, which eventually lasted five years and circumnavigated the globe.

During the voyage, Darwin corresponded by letter with Henslow after reaching South America, and collected specimens with him in mind, particularly plants. Extracts from ten of Darwin's letters from South America to Henslow were first read out at a meeting of the Cambridge Philosophical Society on 16 November 1835, around the time that the ship reached Tahiti. Two days later, Adam Sedgwick read geological notes based on the letters to the Geological Society of London. The Council of the Cambridge Philosophical Society had the extracts printed in a pamphlet dated 1 December 1835, for private distribution among the Members of the Society,.

The pamphlet has been described as the first writing of Charles Darwin ever to be published, but earlier, while still at Cambridge University, he had his notes on insects published in a book by James Francis Stephens.

The readings were held and the pamphlet Extracts from Letters to Henslow was printed without Darwin's knowledge. Upon learning of this pamphlet, Darwin was "a good deal horrified" at Henslow making public "what had been written without care or accuracy". The publicity helped Darwin's career, and at the end of his life acknowledged their friendship as the most important "circumstance" of his life.

The original pamphlet is now rare. According to American Book Prices Current only four copies have appeared at auction since 1975. On 19 June 2014 Christies auctioned an original copy in New York (Sale 2861) and realised $221,000.

In 1960 it was reprinted privately to mark the 100th anniversary of the publication of the "Origin of Species" on 26 November 1859 and issued to Members and Associates of the Society.
