= Syms Covington =

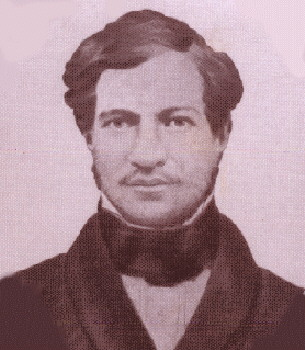
Syms Covington

Syms Covington (1816–1861) was a fiddler and cabin boy on HMS Beagle who became an assistant to Charles Darwin and was appointed as his personal servant in 1833, continuing in Darwin's service after the voyage until 1839. Originally named Simon Covington, he was born in Bedford, Bedfordshire, England, the youngest child of Simon Covington V and Elizabeth Brown. After Covington's trip on the Beagle, he then emigrated to Australia and settled as a postmaster, marrying Eliza Twyford there.

== Beagle voyage ==
When he was fifteen years old, Syms Covington became "fiddler & boy to Poop-cabin" on the second survey expedition of HMS Beagle, which left England on 27 December 1831 under the command of captain Robert FitzRoy.

Covington kept a journal of the voyage, and in September 1832 at Bahía Blanca in South America he noted wildlife found there, including a find of rhea eggs, and giant fossil bones of the megatherium which were collected and sent to England. It is not clear if he was assisting Charles Darwin with this work, but FitzRoy's later account suggests that both Darwin and Covington worked at excavating the fossils, and on 3 November Darwin arranged some clothing for Covington.

On 29 April 1833, Darwin and Covington landed and took up residence ashore at Maldonado, Uruguay, while the Beagle went elsewhere on survey work. After an excursion into the interior lasting twelve days, they spent several weeks at Maldonado preparing the collections to be sent back to England. In a letter home started on 22 May, Darwin told his father that he had decided to take Covington on as a servant –

The following business piece is to my Father: having a servant of my own would be a really great addition to my comfort,—for these two reasons; as at present, the Captain has appointed one of the men always to be with me, but I do not think it just thus to take a seaman out of the ship;—and 2nd when at sea, I am rather badly off for anyone to wait on me. The man is willing to be my servant, & ALL the expences would be under £60 per annum. I have taught him to shoot & skin birds, so that in my main object he is very useful.

He had been thinking about this for some time, but had not yet consulted the captain. In an addition to the letter, dated 6 July, Darwin announced that he had FitzRoy's agreement, and an unexpected saving –

I have asked the Captain & obtained his consent respecting a servant,—but he has saved me much expence by keeping him on the books for victuals, & will write to the Admiralty for permission. So that it will not be much more than £30 per annum. I shall now make a fine collection in birds & quadrupeds, which before took up far too much time. We here got 80 birds and 20 quadrupeds.

As well as working as a servant and general amanuensis, writing out Darwin's records of investigations, Covington became Darwin's assistant as a collector, hunter and taxidermist. In addition to his duties, Covington kept a personal journal regarding his impressions of the voyage. His journal includes accounts ranging from his daily mundane tasks to impressions of the lands and the people he encountered, and it provides an alternative perspective to supplement Darwin's Journal and Remarks, better known as The Voyage of the Beagle.

== Return, work for Darwin and emigration ==
After the Beagle returned in 1836, Covington became Darwin's manservant and continued in his duties as a general amanuensis. His own collection of bird specimens was invaluable in establishing the relationship of Darwin's Finches to each of the Galapagos Islands as, unlike Darwin, he had taken care to label where each specimen had been taken.

Covington remained in Darwin's service until 25 February 1839. He decided to emigrate, and was given a personal reference from Darwin in a letter dated 29 May 1839.

== Life in Australia ==
Records indicate that Covington landed in Sydney in 1840, and he married Eliza Twyford who lived at Stroud, a small town in northern New South Wales. Eliza Twyford was from London, and had traveled to Australia with her family in 1832 on the ship Princess Royal as a free settler. Covington was able to draw on his naval connections to find employment, and by 1843 was working as a clerk at the Sydney coal depot of the Australian Agricultural Company. Around 1844 the family, with their first two sons, accepted the invitation of Captain Lloyd and moved to the South coast property at Pambula, which Lloyd had been given in lieu of a pension from the Royal Navy.

Covington continued to correspond with Darwin, who sent him a gift of a replacement ear-trumpet to help with Covington's increasing deafness. His deafness may have been the result of exposure to guns used in collecting specimens. In response to Darwin's request for specimens, Covington and his eldest son collected a large number of barnacles at nearby Twofold Bay. Darwin's letter of 23 November 1850 expressed his delight at having just received the box, which included particularly unusual species. This contributed to the extensive studies of barnacles which established Darwin as a biologist.

Covington became Postmaster of Pambula in 1854, and managed an inn called the Forest Oak Inn built on the coast road above the floodplain where the first Pambula township had been repeatedly damaged by floods. His original inn was licensed in 1855, and the building which still stands was constructed on the same site about a year later. By 1848 he and his wife had eight children, six sons and two daughters. In 1861 Covington died of 'paralysis' at only 47 years old. The inn was then run by his widow, and later by her second husband Llewelyn Heaven. The license was taken over by John Behl around 1864, and the building became known as The Retreat in 1895. It has been used as a doctor's surgery and more recently as a Thai restaurant, and its red tin roof and double chimneys can still be seen beside a sharp bend of the main Coast Road.

== Legacy ==
=== Books discussing Covington ===
"The Journal of Syms Covington, Assistant to Charles Darwin Esq." was discussed by Jonathan Hodge and Gregory Radick in The Cambridge Companion to Darwin.

In 1998, Australian author Roger McDonald published a novel based on Syms Covington's life and his work for Darwin, called Mr Darwin's Shooter.

The children's book Darwin's Dragons by Lindsay Galvin is told from the fictionalised perspective of Syms Covington.

=== Portrayal in film ===
Covington was portrayed by Sam Downes in the 2009 film The Voyage that Shook the World.

== Commemoration ==
In November 2023 it was announced that Syms Covington was one of 14 people, places and events commemorated in the second round of blue plaques sponsored by the Government of New South Wales alongside Kathleen Butler, godmother of Sydney Harbour Bridge; Emma Jane Callaghan, an Aboriginal midwife and activist; Susan Katherina Schardt; journalist Dorothy Drain; writer Charmian Clift; Beryl Mary McLaughlin, one of the first three women to graduate in architecture from the University of Sydney; Grace Emily Munro, Sir William Dobell, Ioannis (Jack) and Antonios (Tony) Notaras; Ken Thomas of Thomas Nationwide Transport, Bondi Surf Bathers' Life Saving Club and the first release of myxomatosis.
