= Jim Button and Luke the Engine Driver =

Children's novel by Michael Ende

- Original German language edition (1960) titled Jim Knopf und Lukas der Lokomotivführer
- Author: Michael Ende
- Original title: Jim Knopf und Lukas der Lokomotivführer
- Illustrator: Franz Josef Tripp
- Language: German
- Series: Jim Button
- Genre: Fantasy
- Publisher: Thienemann, Stuttgart
- Publication date: 1960
- Publication place: West Germany
- English publication date: 1963
- Followed by: Jim Button and the Wild 13

Jim Button and Luke the Engine Driver (German: Jim Knopf und Lukas der Lokomotivführer) is a children's novel written by Michael Ende. The main characters are Luke (Lukas) driver of Emma the steam locomotive, and his young friend/apprentice Jim Button (Jim Knopf) who go on an adventure together. The story begins and ends on the small fictional island of Morrowland (Lummerland).

The book was published in 1960, and received the German Young Literature Prize in 1961. It is one of the most successful German language children's books of the postwar era. The success led to thirty-four translations into other languages and the sequel Jim Button and the Wild 13 (Jim Knopf und die Wilde 13).

Ende did not see his book as a children's book, but just wrote it for himself. Over a dozen publishers rejected the book prior to publication.

== Plot ==
=== Jim Button and Luke the Engine Driver ===
The story begins on a tiny island called Morrowland (original German: Lummerland, a play on Nimmerland, the German translation of Neverland), which has just enough space for a small palace, a train station and rails all around the island, a grocery store, a small house, a king, two subjects, a locomotive named Emma, and a locomotive engineer by the name of Luke (Lukas) (who, as railway civil servant, is not a subject). One day, the postman – who has to come by ship – drops off a package with a nearly illegible address for a Mrs. Krintuuth at Zorroulend. On the back was a large 13. After a futile search for the addressee among Morrowland's few inhabitants, they open the package. To their immense surprise, there's a black baby inside. After the commotion has died down, the baby is adopted by the islanders and is named Jim Button.

As Jim grows up, the King begins to worry that the island is too small and there won't be enough space for Jim to live on once he's an adult. He announces to Luke that Emma has to be removed. Luke, upset about this decision, decides to leave the island with Emma, and Jim (who had accidentally overheard Luke relating his woes to Emma) decides to come along. They convert Emma into a makeshift ship and sail off the island in the night, eventually arriving at the coast of Mandala (a fictional country inspired by China).

When they arrive in Ping, the capital, they win the friendship of a tiny great-grandchild named Ping Pong, who tells them the Emperor is in mourning. His daughter, Li Si, has been kidnapped and is being held in the Dragon City. Luke and Jim offer their help, and while investigating the circumstances of Li Si's disappearance, they stumble upon several names which are directly connected to Jim's mysterious arrival on Morrowland: Mrs. Grindtooth (Frau Mahlzahn), the Wild 13, and Sorrowland (Kummerland). Now Jim and Luke have another reason to go to the Dragon City, located in Sorrowland, and confront Mrs. Grindtooth.

After a long and hazardous journey, they arrive in the Dragon City. Along the way, they make two new friends, Mr. Tur Tur, a "Scheinriese" ("apparent giant", as he appears smaller the closer he gets) and Nepomuk, a half-dragon. Jim and Luke free Princess Li Si and a large number of children, who had all been kidnapped and sold to Mrs. Grindtooth by a gang of pirates (the Wild 13). Mrs. Grindtooth had chained the children to desks at her school, where she had barked lessons to them like a Kommandant. Jim and Luke take Mrs. Grindtooth with them as they make their way back on the Yellow River, which begins right at the Dragon City. Arriving back in Mandala, they receive a triumphal welcome and are surprised by some startling news. Mrs. Grindtooth is about to turn into a Golden Dragon of Wisdom, and the other inhabitants of Morrowland want them back on the island!

With parting advice given by the now-reformed Mrs. Grindtooth and generous assistance from the Emperor, Luke and Jim come into possession of a floating island, which is named New-Morrowland, to serve as Jim's future residence. After a cordial welcome back on Morrowland, Jim and Li Si become engaged. Emma gives birth to a baby steam locomotive who will be Jim's. He names her Molly.

=== Jim Button and the Wild 13 ===
Jim Button and the Wild 13 (Jim Knopf und die Wilde 13) is the sequel and concludes the story of the first book.

Following the events in Jim Button and Luke the Engine Driver, life in Morrowland continues as usual for a year until the postman rams New-Morrowland with his mail boat in the dark of night. It is decided that the island needs a lighthouse, but the island is too small to support one. Jim remembers Mr. Tur Tur and his ability to appear as a giant when seen from afar, and Jim and Luke decide to invite him to Morrowland to use his unique ability as a living lighthouse.

While sailing the oceans with the two steam locomotives Emma and Molly to the desert where Mr. Tur Tur lives, Jim and Luke stop to help out a mermaid named Sursulapitschi and her father, Lormoral, the king of the seas. This leads to a precarious encounter with the Magnetic Cliffs, whose magnetic pull can be turned off and on. When on, they activate a phenomenon called the Sea Glow, which illuminates the bottom of the sea, but also activates the magnetic pull, endangering passing ships; so someone must be found to ensure that no ships are endangered while the Sea Glow is switched on. In addition, Sursulapitschi is distressed because her fiancée, a "Schildnöck" (turtle merman) named Ushaurischuum, has been assigned by her father to refashion the Crystal of Eternity, a task only possible with the aid of a creature of fire, with whom the merpeople are at war.

Using the special properties of the cliffs' material, Jim and Luke convert Emma into a flying vehicle which they dub the "Perpetumobile" due to its unlimited means of locomotion. With it, they cross the Crown of the World to get Mr. Tur Tur. To their surprise, in the desert they also encounter their half-dragon friend Nepomuk, who had had to flee the Dragon City following the events in the first book, for his help in capturing Mrs. Grindtooth. Jim and Luke persuade Nepomuk to accompany them and take up the post at the Magnetic Cliffs. Unexpectedly, the four meet Sursulapitschi and Ushaurishuum at the cliffs, and the Schildnöck and Nepomuk quickly become friends, enabling the recreation of the Crystal of Eternity.

Meanwhile, Jim's locomotive Molly, whom Jim and Luke had left at the cliffs when getting Mr. Tur Tur and Nepomuk, has been abducted by the band of pirates called the Wild 13. Luckily for Jim and Luke, the former Mrs. Grindtooth awakes as a Golden Dragon of Wisdom in Mandala, helping them out with information and telling Jim how to find out about his origin. With the help of the Emperor, Jim and Luke – and Princess Li Si as a stowaway – start their journey to meet the Wild 13 and rescue Molly. They encounter the pirates, who prove too much for them in battle. Molly is lost at sea, and all but Jim are captured and brought to the pirates' base, Castle Stormeye, a pinnacle of rock within the eye of a perpetual hurricane.

Unseen, Jim manages to sneak into the pirates' fortress, overpower them with a trick and some luck, and become their leader. As it turns out, Jim is the last descendant of Caspar, the third of the Three Kings, whose heirs were doomed to remain homeless after Mrs. Grindtooth had sunk their kingdom beneath the ocean millennia ago. Only the sinking of Castle Stormeye will raise it back to the surface. In the end, the Wild 13 sacrifice their fortress, Jim's old kingdom reappears – and to everyone's surprise, Morrowland turns out to be located at the top of the realm's highest mountain.

All the families whose children Jim and Luke had rescued from the Dragon City come to live in the new country. Jim marries Li Si and receives Molly from the merpeople, her iron frame transformed into the Crystal of Eternity. The Wild 13, reformed by their sacrifice, remain in Jim's kingdom as its protectors and royal guards. Mr. Tur Tur, meanwhile, goes to live on Morrowland as the world's largest lighthouse.

== Settings ==
"Morrowland", where the story begins, is a microcosm of early modern society, with a king, a burgher, a merchant, and a worker. (Note: But not quite. Luke is not actually a worker: he is not even counted among the subjects of Morrowland – an obvious reference to the fact that he is actually that state's civil servant, as engine drivers used to be in pre-reunification Germany.) The novel and its sequel take place roughly in the 20th century, but have anachronistic elements. China is still an empire, Native American Indians and Eskimos still live in traditional ways, yet there are ocean liners, telephones, a postal service, chewing gum and other modern conveniences. There are many fictional locations, like the "Crown of the World", a vast mountain range coloured in red and white stripes, and the "Magnetic Cliffs". Some locations are based on real places, such as the Himalayas, and legendary ones, such as the magnetic cliffs in the Voyages of Sinbad the Sailor and a beautiful abandoned city under the sea, patterned after Atlantis. China is depicted in a phantasmic way; in later German editions, the country name was changed to Mandala.

In Morrowland, people lead an old-fashioned, idyllic life, albeit with modern conveniences. The rest of the world, however, is full of fantasy. As the Frankfurter Allgemeine Zeitung wrote, children read Jim Button at a time in their lives when "the existence of dragons is as real as dinosaurs and kings [are] closer than the chancellor". The contrast between reality and fantasy is reflected in several places. In Morrowland, Jim is a normal child. He plays outside and doesn't like to wash; his mother sometimes worries about him. Outside Morrowland, however, he goes on adventures, experiences exotic cultures, fights a dragon and finally, saves a princess.

== List of Jim Button characters ==
Jim Button (Jim Knopf)
The titular hero, this character shares the "glory" with and is the sidekick of his best friend Luke, the engine driver. He grows up on Morrowland (Lummerland) under the care of Mrs. Whaat. He wants to be an engine driver too. His name is derived from his habit of tearing a hole in his trousers every time he does something wild. After mending the hole many times, Mrs. Whaat added a button so it could be opened, rather than torn up yet again. While he marries the Chinese Emperor's daughter and turns out to be the rightful King of Jamballa, he never gives up driving a locomotive.
Luke (Lukas)
The engine driver on Morrowland is Jim's closest friend. Where Jim represents adventurous youth, Luke is the man of experience and practicality who manages to solve almost every technical problem. He is very strong and is an expert spitter capable of spitting a loop. His trademark is his pipe, which he smokes in emotional situations.
Princess Li Si
The daughter of the Chinese Emperor is rather headstrong and obstinate, especially when it comes to discipline. She admires Jim for his courage and intelligence, even though for most of the story he refuses to learn how to read and write, skills she has already mastered quite well. Her name is a pun on the German variant of Lizzy.
Emma and Molly
Luke and Jim's tank locomotives. Emma is quite sensitive, expressing her feelings about Luke's mood by whistling and huffing, despite the fact she often does not quite understand the reason for her owner's mood. Molly is her daughter, thus smaller and younger.
Mrs. Whaat (Frau Waas)
The proprietor of a grocery store on Morrowland, and Jim's surrogate mother. She loves Jim dearly and worries about him constantly when he is on an adventure. Her special skill is making sweets, particularly ice cream and Gugelhupf. One of Mrs. Whaat's ancestors was hearing impaired, saying "whaaaaat?" whenever he didn't understand properly, eventually earning her family its name.
King Alfred the Quarter-to-Twelfth (König Alfons der Viertel-vor-Zwölfte)
The king of Morrowland, who is named after the stroke of the clock at the time of his birth and at which he shows himself to his subjects on holidays. He is extremely well-meaning and benevolent, but can get overly nervous under stress and is very inattentive and forgetful.
Mr. Sleeve (Herr Ärmel)
A citizen of Morrowland and a subject of King Alfred. He is portrayed as a stereotypical Englishman and is most often seen taking a stroll, wearing a bowler hat and carrying an umbrella. He is very polite, educated, and intellectual, and he is well liked by the island's other inhabitants. Initially he has no job in the book (he "is just there and is being ruled"), though eventually he makes use of his magnificent education in becoming Jim Button's teacher. In the Augsburger Puppenkiste version he works as a photographer.
Mr. Tur Tur
This Scheinriese ("pseudo-giant" or "mock giant") is a gentle and modest person and a vegetarian, but a tragic recluse due to his unusual nature: When seen from a distance, he appears to be a giant, inadvertently frightening everyone who beholds him; when approached, it turns out he is actually of normal height. Consequently, he lives at an oasis in the desert, "The End of the World".
Nepomuk
A half-dragon by birth, because his mother was a hippopotamus, and still has some resemblance to his mother. Like his fellow mixed-race dragons, he is not accepted by the pure-blood dragons in Sorrowland. He tries to behave like a "real" dragon by being scary and mean, while he is actually neither. (A certain naughtiness, which he later promises to overcome, does seem to belong to his actual traits, though.) However, he is able to help Ushaurishuum create the Crystal of Eternity, and becomes the keeper of the Magnetic Cliffs.
Pung Ging
The Emperor of China and Li Si's father. A kind and just ruler who befriends Jim and Luke after they offer to free his daughter from Mrs. Grindtooth's clutches.
Ping Pong
A very young and tiny Chinese boy whose head is the size of a ping pong ball. Hardly more than a year old and no taller than a man's hand, he is already very capable of behaving and thinking like an adult. (Note: This stereotypical depiction of the Chinese is common in the story. The country called China in the first editions of the book was later changed to "Mandala". The 1990 English translation again uses "China", however (Athenea Bell, Overlook Press, Woodstock, NY).) He is one of the numerous descendants of the Emperor's chief cook; after saving Jim and Luke from a treacherous and manipulative minister, he is made Prime Minister of China by the Emperor – a role which he fulfills surprisingly capably.
Mrs. Grindtooth (Frau Mahlzahn)
A pure-blood dragon and the main antagonist of the first story. Her name comes from the single fang projecting from her long snout. She is very knowledgeable and intelligent, but like all dragons, likes to torment lesser beings with her power. She runs a school for human children in Sorrowland.
The Wild 13 (Die Wilde Dreizehn)
A band of pirates completely identical in appearance and ability. Fearsome pirates and seamen, they are not particularly bright and are poorly educated, each of them knowing only one particular letter of the alphabet. First portrayed as antagonists, they evolve into important characters and plot carriers in the sequel.:Even though they are named "The Wild 13", they are actually only 12 men. This mistake happens because of a fault in their logic. Every day they elect one of their own as a new leader, so they reason they are twelve plus the leader, which results in them thinking they are thirteen.

== Literary references ==
Michael Ende grew up in Nazi Germany. His father, Edgar Ende, a painter, was banned as "degenerate" in 1936. Ende began writing the story in 1956 to provide a contrast to the Nazis' racist ideology and their misuse of the theory of evolution. In a 1991 radio interview, he stated, "The idea of racism and racial discrimination came from further consideration of Darwin's theories." Quoting Nazi euphemisms, he added, "The 'extermination of lives unworthy of life' and 'concentration camps'."

Ende based the title character of Jim Button (Jim Knopf) on Jemmy Button, a native Fuegian who, as a teenager in the 19th century, was sold for a mother-of-pearl button and taken to England. He later returned to his homeland on HMS Beagle, by way of the Galapagos Islands, along with fellow passenger Charles Darwin, who later wrote about the episode.

That Ende's book was full of Nazi symbols and imagery turned on their head, and that its English references stemmed from his interest in Darwin was unknown until late 2008, when Julia Voss, a German journalist, published an article in the Frankfurter Allgemeine Zeitung revealing the story's background. Voss cites aspects of Ende's book and of English colonialism, showing their similarity. Her examples of Nazi education and indoctrination, as well as information about Ende's own experiences with it, reveal the sources that inspired him.

Voss' 2008 article explained that Ende's book was not the "escapist literature" of pure fantasy, as had always been assumed, in part from Ende's own frequent warnings about hiding messages in books. Voss identified numerous literary references in the book, some which reverse the Nazi indoctrination of Ende's youth and others, which stem from his interest in Darwin and draw on English culture and history.

Darwin's first book, The Voyage of the Beagle, contains passages about Jemmy Button, a teenaged native Fuegian who was sold for a mother-of-pearl button and brought to England, an island nation. Darwin describes Button's character and demeanor and relates details about his capture and sale, explaining his unusual name, and about his return to his homeland, two years later. (Note: There were three other young Fuegians captured along with Jemmy Button, given unusual English names and brought to England. One died shortly after arriving in England. The other two, York Minster and Fuegia Basket, were returned to their home along with Jemmy Button. (See "The Return of Fuegia Basket, Jemmy Button, and York Minster"))

=== British references ===
Like the real-life Jemmy Button, Ende's Jim Button is brought to an island nation and is seen by the inhabitants as racially exotic, but is quickly accepted and becomes well liked. Shipping, which during England's colonial era, began bringing goods from around the globe, also plays an important role in Morrowland. Mrs. Whaat's grocery store is supplied from all corners of world once a week by Ende's own version of the Royal Mail Steam Packet Company and Morrowland's mail arrives by ship.

English culture also appears in the character of Mr. Sleeve, who, like the stereotypical Englishman, wears a bowler and carries an umbrella, is polite and well educated. His unusual name in the original German, Herr Ärmel, is a reference to the Ärmelkanal, the German name for the English Channel.

=== Nazi symbols revisited ===
Ende's Jim refuses to learn to read or write, harking back to Ende's own experience with Nazi education and indoctrination, which he regarded with horror. Said Ende, "I didn't want to learn, at least not what they endeavored to teach us there." Voss explains that subjects like German, history and geography took a back seat to biology, where the need for racial purity was drummed into pupils on official order. Quoting from Nazi literature, Voss writes, "no boy or girl should leave school without having been led to the ultimate cognition of the imperative need [for] and essence of racial purity." Ende's school in Sorrowland is run by a dragon who has a skull on her door, reminding of Heinrich Himmler's Totenkopfverbände, and she terrorizes the children with a baton and teaches them lessons on eugenics and racial purity. The dragon's pupils have all been kidnapped, brought there against their will.

Recalling the anti-semitic signs seen on entrances during Nazi Germany, the Dragon City announces its racial policy at the city's entrance with a sign that reads, "Attention! Entry by racially impure dragons forbidden on pain of death." (Note: This quote is translated from a German article, rather than the book's English translation, which may be slightly different.) Ende spent the summer of 1943 visiting his grandparents in Hamburg, when the allies' serial bombing raids, caused firestorms and damage so catastrophic, the Nazis furloughed 2,000 prisoners for two months. Ende paints the Dragon City as a smoldering "land of a thousand volcanos", a hellish place. The entrance to the city looks like a smoking oven, which the protagonists enter on a train; an overt allusion to the Nazi's concentration camps. Nepomuk, who is only half dragon, is not allowed by the racially pure dragons to enter the Dragon City.

The myth of Atlantis had a special meaning to the Nazis, who held that Atlantis was the ancient homeland of the Aryan race. Children's books were imbued with Nazi racial policies and Atlantis was mentioned in many. Sun Koh, the hero of a science fiction series, complains in a story from 1935 that the races were not kept pure, except in Germany, where a methodical racial policy was breeding the Nordic roots again. Koh says, "If our Atlantis once again rises out of the sea, then we will get from there the blond, steel-hard men with the pure blood and will create with them the master race, which will finally rule the earth." Ende brings this scenario about, only with the decidedly non-blond Jim Button as king and Ende creates a multi-ethnic and -cultural paradise, a utopia where people from every corner of the earth, and even birds, flock to it because there is no fear there.

While the world associates the word Führer with Hitler, in German, the word is in everyday parlance as "driver", "conductor" or "leader". Early in his first book, Ende writes, "Lokomotiven haben zwar keinen großen Verstand – deshalb brauchen sie ja auch immer einen Führer". In English, the sentence has only its superficial meaning, "Locomotives actually have no great understanding – which is why they always need a conductor". Not so in German, where it has a double entendre.

== Adaptations ==
Both Jim Button stories were adapted by the Augsburger Puppenkiste, a marionette theater company that adapted children's stories for television in the 1960s and 70s. Their production of Jim Button, first filmed in the early 1960s in black and white, was so successful, it was remade in the 1970s in color. A classic known for its creativity, such as the use of plastic wrap to simulate moving water, it celebrated its 50th anniversary in 2011 with much fanfare. Its theme song, the "Lummerlandlied" ("Morrowland Song") is immediately recognized and in the 1990s, was covered by a German dance music group named Dolls United and itself became a hit. (Note: The group, Dolls United, made remixes from the songs of popular children's programs from earlier decades.) There are two sets of original marionettes for the Jim Button production. One is in the Puppenkiste's museum and the other tours the world.

In 1974, the story was turned into a Japanese animation. A dramatized audio book, Jim Knopf und Lukas der Lokomotivführer (Fontana/Deutsche Grammophon) was narrated and directed by Ende himself. In 1998, a 52-episode cartoon series titled Jim Button was produced by Yoram Gross-Village Roadshow, Saban Entertainment, Saban International Paris, and CinéGroupe. The storyline diverged from the original novels with the introduction of new characters and settings.

A German-language feature film adaptation, Jim Button and Luke the Engine Driver, was directed by Dennis Gansel, produced by Rat Pack Filmproduktion and Malao Film, and released by Warner Bros. Pictures on 29 March 2018 in German cinemas. It stars Michael Herbig as the German voice of Nepomuk, and Rick Kavanian as the Wild 13, and Judy Winter as the voice of the villainous dragon Mrs. Grindtooth. The soundtrack also features a cover version of the Augsburger Puppenkiste's "Lummerlandlied", as a homage to this early adaptation.

A cinematic adaptation of the second book, Jim Button and the Wild 13, was announced in late March 2018. Filming began in January 2019, and the film, initially planned for Easter 2020, but slightly delayed due to the COVID-19 pandemic, was eventually released on 1 October 2020.

- Jim Knopf und Lukas der Lokomotivführer (1961), puppet show directed by Harald Schäfer, based on children's novel Jim Button and Luke the Engine Driver
- Jim Knopf und die Wilde 13 (1962), puppet show directed by Harald Schäfer, based on children's novel Jim Button and the Wild 13
- Jim Knopf und Lukas der Lokomotivführer (1977), puppet show directed by Manfred Jenning, based on children's novel Jim Button and Luke the Engine Driver
- Jim Knopf und die Wilde 13 (1978), puppet show directed by Manfred Jenning, based on children's novel Jim Button and the Wild 13
- Jim Button (1999–2001), animated series directed by Bruno Bianchi, André Leduc, Jan Nonhof and Jean-Michel Spiner, based on series of children's novels Jim Button
- Jim Button and Luke the Engine Driver (2018), film directed by Dennis Gansel, based on children's novel Jim Button and Luke the Engine Driver
- Jim Button and the Wild 13 (2020), film directed by Dennis Gansel, based on children's novel Jim Button and the Wild 13
