= This Thing of Darkness =

2005 novel by Harry Thompson

- Author: Harry Thompson
- Language: English
- Subject: Robert FitzRoy
- Genre: Historical novel
- Set in: 1828–1865
- Publisher: Headline Review
- Publication date: 6 June 2005
- Pages: 640
- ISBN: 978-0755302802

This Thing of Darkness (published in the United States as To the Edge of the World) was the debut novel of Harry Thompson, published in 2005 only months before his death in November of that year at the age of 45. Set in the period from 1828 to 1865, it is a historically fictionalised biography of Robert FitzRoy, who was given command of HMS Beagle halfway through its first voyage. He subsequently captained the vessel over its famous second voyage, during which Charles Darwin travelled as his companion.

The novel was longlisted for the Man Booker Prize.

== Historical background ==
Born to an aristocratic family, Robert FitzRoy joined the Royal Naval College, Portsmouth aged 12 and entered the Royal Navy the following year, rising rapidly through the ranks. The novel begins in 1828 with the suicide of the commander of HMS Beagle, Pringle Stokes, and FitzRoy's subsequent appointment as the vessel's (temporary) captain at the age of twenty-three.

Whilst conducting Beagle's mission of surveying Patagonia and Tierra del Fuego, during which he proved to be a meticulous surveyor, he captured four native Fuegians (Fuegia Basket, Jemmy Button, York Minster, and Boat Memory) and brought them back to England when Beagle returned in October 1830. FitzRoy's intention was that they should be educated and converted to Christianity before being returned to their homelands, where they would be able to act as interpreters – with the aim of establishing friendly relations between their fellow countrymen and the British – and also use their new knowledge to improve the lives of their compatriots. The captives became celebrities and were presented to King William IV; Boat Memory later died from smallpox.

FitzRoy undertook the second voyage of HMS Beagle to return the surviving three Fuegians, at considerable personal expense. He was accompanied by Charles Darwin, who by the end of the voyage had become famous in scientific circles as a result of the discoveries he made during it, and who also collected much of the material that was to underpin his evolutionary theories during these travels. By 1860, following the publication of On the Origin of Species, FitzRoy – a committed Christian – later regretted that he had facilitated Darwin's research.

On Beagle's return to England, FitzRoy was elected as the Tory Member of Parliament for Durham. He was appointed to several official posts, amongst them becoming the second Governor of New Zealand. His attempts to treat the indigenous Māori population equitably made him unpopular with the settlers and the New Zealand Company and he was subsequently recalled to England.

FitzRoy was a pioneer of developing charts to allow weather predictions to be made; weather forecasting is named after his attempts at what he called "forecasting the weather". He published the world's first daily weather forecasts in The Times in 1860 and also provided personal forecasts to Queen Victoria.

He committed suicide in April 1865 as a result of depression and a combination of problems at the Meteorological Office, which he headed, and personal financial and health difficulties.

== Title ==
The title comes from Prospero's line "This thing of darkness I acknowledge mine" in Act V, Scene 1 of William Shakespeare's play The Tempest.

== Characters ==
This Thing of Darkness includes a large cast of fictionalised historical persons. In addition to FitzRoy and Darwin, the characters include:

- Bartholomew Sulivan, British naval officer and hydrographer
- Boat Memory (original name unknown), a native Fuegian brought to England
- Syms Covington, cabin boy on HMS Beagle and later a servant of Charles Darwin
- Reverend George Packenham Despard, a missionary in the Falklands Islands
- Fuegia Basket (original name yok'cushly), a native Fuegian girl brought to England
- Jemmy Button (original name o'run-del'lico), a native Fuegian brought to England
- Maria Isabella Smyth, second wife of Robert Fitzroy
- Mary Henrietta O'Brien, first wife of Robert FitzRoy
- Philip Parker King, British naval officer and explorer
- Reverend Richard Matthews, a missionary in New Zealand
- Robert McCormick British Royal Navy Ship's Surgeon, explorer and naturalist
- Thomas Moore, governor of the Falkland Islands
- William Sheppard, prospective parliamentary candidate
- York Minster (original name el'leparu), a native Fuegian brought to England

== Critical reaction ==
In The Independent on Sunday, Stephen Knight wrote: “A hybrid of novel-of-ideas and ripping yarn, This Thing of Darkness is more convincingly the latter. The crew's skirmishes with South American natives and a storm off the coast of Uruguay, presaged by wind-blown clouds of butterflies and moths, are beautifully managed set-pieces, pacy, gripping, and vividly chaotic”. He found the characterisation less effective, saying: “If Thompson's tendency to spell out his characters' thoughts saves us from imagining a subtext, it does not make his creations more rounded. For all their musings, many only register as stereotypes, and, as a consequence, few deaths properly haunt the reader.”

In The Independent, Roz Kaveney found Thompson to be “writing as much about relationships as ideas. His account of the prickly friendship of the Tory prig Fitzroy and the cold-hearted Radical Darwin owes much to other novels of naval life and their forced intimacies; the spirit of Patrick O'Brian is often not far away”. Kaveney was unconvinced by aspects of the novel, saying: “Part of the trouble here is that Thompson is adapting the historical record for the purposes of fiction and is free to load the evidence. He can make Fitzroy's belief in biblical inerrancy a refusal to ditch religion in the face of inconclusive evidence from geology and zoology, while omitting the concurrent debates about the nature of the biblical text. The historical Fitzroy chose to ignore several sorts of evidence. Thompson also portrays Darwin as more racist in the modern sense than Fitzroy, again by shuffling his deck of facts.” She concluded that “This Thing of Darkness is two sorts of book: a superior adventure story and a polemic. One can enjoy the former considerably while noting that the manners of the latter are wanting.”

Robert Colvile, writing in The Observer was more impressed, finding: “The bare facts of Charles Darwin's voyage to the Galapagos, and his formulation of the theory of natural selection, are well known. It takes an expert author to make a new pattern from such familiar cloth, yet this is precisely what Harry Thompson has done. […] While rarely lyrical, Thompson's prose drives the reader through the 750 pages with the unstoppable force of an ocean current, fusing brisk action, challenging ideas and gut-wrenching emotion into an astonishingly assured debut - and memorial”.
