= Sylvia Iparraguirre =

Argentine novelist and human rights activist

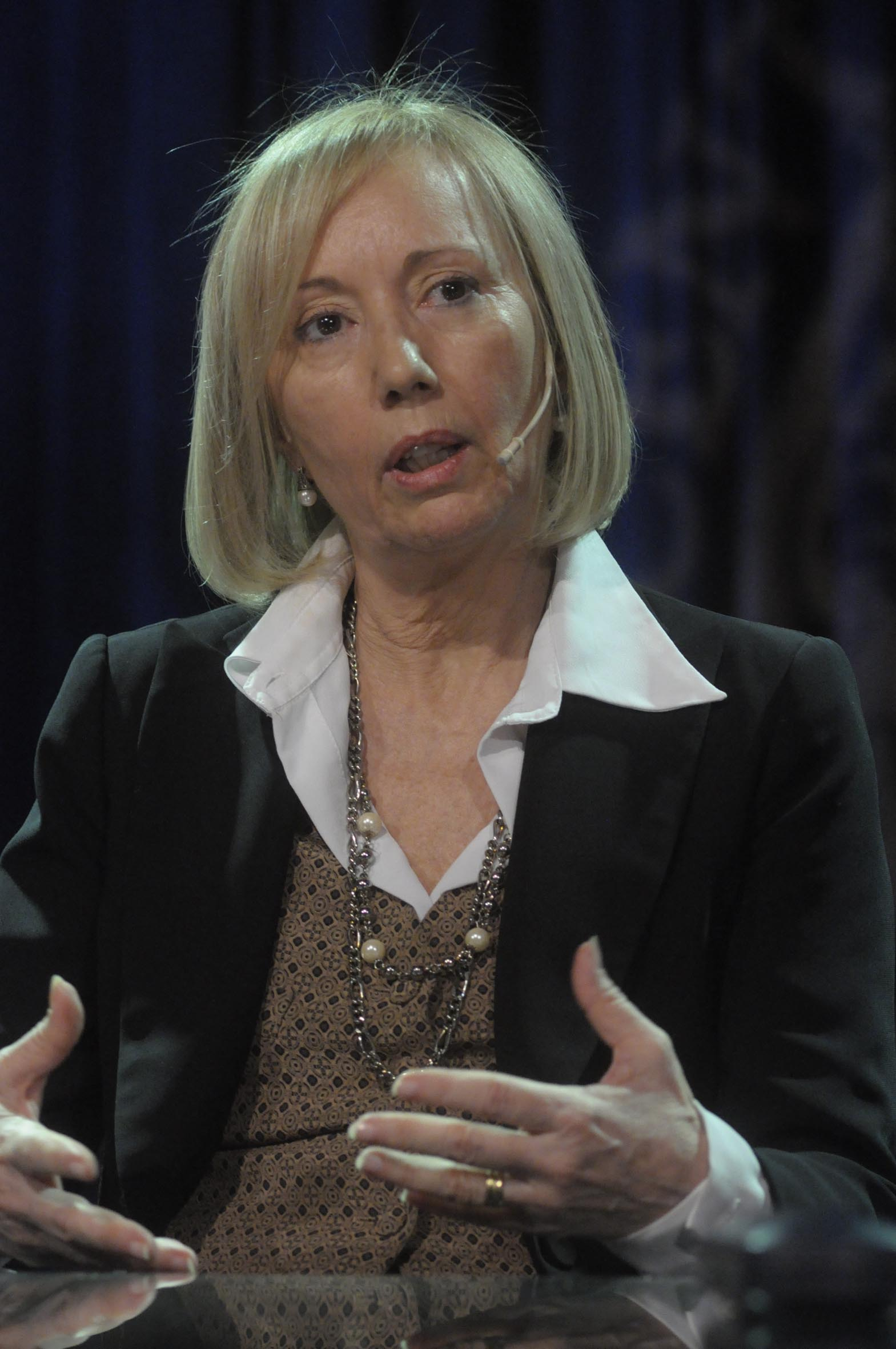
Iparraguirre in 2010

Sylvia Iparraguirre (born 1947) is an Argentine novelist and human rights activist, currently working as a postgraduate professor at the University of Buenos Aires. She is a recipient of the Sor Juana Inés de la Cruz Prize, the Premio Esteban Echeverría, and the Premio Konex de Platino. Her work has been translated into more than ten languages.

== Biographic Overview ==
She was born in Junín, Buenos Aires and studied literature at the University of Buenos Aires. She was part of Conicet, specializing in sociolinguistics and the work of Mikhail Bakhtin. At the age of 21 she met fellow writer Abelardo Castillo, whom she married in 1976. A year later, the two of them founded the literary magazine El Ornitorrinco alongside Liliana Heker, publishing many works opposing the military dictatorship and its censorship. Prior to this, she had begun regularly publishing works in her husband's magazine El Escarabajo de Oro.

Her novel Tierra del Fuego: Una Biografia del Fin del Mundo won the 1999 Sor Juana Inés de la Cruz Prize for women writers in Spanish. It is a fictionalised account of the life of Jemmy Button, a member of the Yaghan people from islands around Tierra del Fuego, who as abducted by Captain Robert Fitzroy and brought to England.

She published La Vida Invisible in 2017, which is an autobiography told through the lens of her favorite books. She states that she was influenced and inspired by Jorge Luis Borges, Virginia Woolf, and Katherine Mansfield, among others.

Iparraguirre is also involved in advocacy work through her writing, specifically for the indigenous peoples of Argentina.

== Works ==
=== Books and Short Story Collections ===
- En el invierno de las ciudades (1988), Editorial Galerna, ISBN 950-556-218-7
- Probables lluvias por la noche (1993), Emecé Editores, ISBN 950-04-1246-2
- El Parque (1996), Alfaguara
- La tierra del fuego (1998), Alfaguara
- El muchacho de los senos de goma (2007), Alfaguara
- La Orfandad (2010), Alfaguara
- Encuentro con Munch (2013), Alfaguara
- Antes que desaparezca (2021), Alfaguara

=== Essays ===
- La vida invisible (2017), Ampersand
- Clases de literatura rusa (2023), Alfaguara

== See also ==
- Lists of writers

== Sources ==
- Bio details and bibliography, Government of Buenos Aires
- Bio details, literatura.org
