= Mirror in the Mirror =

Collection of short stories by Michael Ende

First edition (German, publ. Weitbrecht)

Mirror in the Mirror: A Labyrinth is a collection of short stories by Michael Ende originally published in German 1984 with the title Der Spiegel im Spiegel. All stories in the book have their own protagonists, but are related to each other by the use of literary leitmotivs. None of the stories has its own title. Ende wrote the 30 short stories - according to the dedication at the beginning of the book - for his father Edgar Ende, whose artistic work (the book is illustrated with 18 of his paintings) inspired the short stories.

== Themes and motives ==
The main motive of the collection is the question "What is reflected in a mirror which is reflected in a mirror?" Ende does not provide a clear answer to this question during the course of the book. In a letter, he stated that he intended the title to be taken as a metaphor for the relationship between reader and the book:

"That brings me to the real reason for the title: Where does that which happens during reading a book take place? (...) Does not every reader, whether he wants it or not, bring (...) his own experiences and thoughts into the process of reading? (...) Is not every book a mirror in which the reader is reflected, whether he knows it or not? And is not every reader a mirror in which the book is reflected?"

Recurring motives are the question about the purpose of life, a constant waiting for something which is never to happen, a search for freedom and the criticism of an inhuman society. Most of the stories do not allow for a clear interpretation; instead, as Ende himself stated:

"If one claims to have 'understood' something or to be able to 'explain' something, that usually means nothing more than to reduce it to something known before, to something familiar. (...) While writing this book I intended to invite the reader to something of a free game, where the content of imagination or consciousness is constantly destroyed or transformed so that it becomes impossible to cling to it."

== Content ==
- "Forgive me, I Cannot Speak any Louder" ("Verzeih mir, ich kann nicht lauter sprechen")
- "Under Expert Instructions, the Son Had..." ("Der Sohn hatte sich unter der kundigen Anleitung")
- "The Garret is Sky Blue" ("Die Mansarde ist himmelblau")
- "The Station’s Cathedral was Built on a Large Clod of Earth" ("Die Bahnhofskathedrale stand auf einer großen Scholle")
- "Heavy Black Cloth" ("Schweres schwarzes Tuch")
- "The Lady Pushed aside the Curtain of her Carriage Window" ("Die Dame schob den schwarzen Vorhang ihres Kutschenfensters beiseite")
- "The Witness States that he Had been on a Meadow by Night" ("Der Zeuge gibt an, er habe sich auf einer nächtlichen Wiese befunden")
- "In the Courtroom, Among the Spectators Sat the Marble Pale Angel" ("Der marmorbleiche Engel saß unter den Zuhörern im Gerichtssaal")
- "Dark as a Moor is the Mother's Face" ("Moordunkel ist das Gesicht der Mutter")
- "Slow As a Planet turns, the Great Round Table is Turning" ("Langsam wie ein Planet sich dreht, dreht sich der große runde Tisch")
- "The Inside of a Face with Closed Eyes, Nothing Else" ("Das Innere eines Gesichts mit geschlossenen Augen, sonst nichts")
- "The Bridge that We Built since many Centuries" ("Die Brücke, an der wir schon seit vielen Jahrhunderten bauen")
- "It is a Room and also a Desert" ("Es ist ein Zimmer und zugleich eine Wüste")
- "The Wedding Guests were Dancing Flames" ("Die Hochzeitsgäste waren tanzende Flammen")
- "An Ice Skater was Gliding across the Wide, Grey Surface of the Sky" ("Über die weite graue Fläche des Himmels glitt ein Schlittschuhläufer dahin")
- "This Army Contains only Letters" ("Dieses Heer besteht nur aus Buchstaben")
- "In Principle, this was about Sheep" ("Eigentlich ging es um die Schafe")
- "Man and Wife Want to Visit an Exhibition" ("Mann und Frau wollen eine Ausstellung besuchen")
- "The Young Doctor Got Permission..." ("Dem jungen Arzt war gestattet worden")
- "After the Office Hours" ("Nach Bureauschluss")
- "The Brothel Palace on Top of the Hill was Illuminated in this Night" ("Der Bordellpalast auf dem Berge erstrahlte in dieser Nacht")
- "The World Traveller Decided on his Journey" ("Der Weltreisende beschloß seine Wanderung")
- "This Evening the Old Sailor Couldn't Bear the Constant Wind any Longer" ("An diesem Abend konnte der alte Seefahrer den ununterbrochenen Wind nicht mehr ertragen")
- "Beneath a Black Sky lies an Inhabitable Country" ("Unter einem schwarzen Himmel liegt ein unbewohnbares Land")
- "Hand in Hand, Two Walk down a Street" ("Hand in Hand gehen zwei eine Straße hinunter")
- "In the Classroom it Rains Constantly" ("Im Klassenzimmer regnete es unaufhörlich")
- "In the Actors' Hallway we Met a Few Hundred People Waiting" ("Im Korridor der Schauspieler trafen wir einige hundert Wartende")
- "Fire Was Opened Once More" ("Das Feuer wurde von neuem eröffnet")
- "A Circus is Burning" ("Der Zirkus brennt")
- "A Winter’s Evening" ("Ein Winterabend")

== Reception ==
Mirror in the Mirror was translated into 13 languages and was made into an audiobook.

== Adaptations ==
- Cathedrals (2013), short documentary directed by Konrad Kästner, based on short story "The Station's Cathedral was Built on a Large Clod of Earth"
