= Jemmy Button =

Yaghan native, celebrity in England

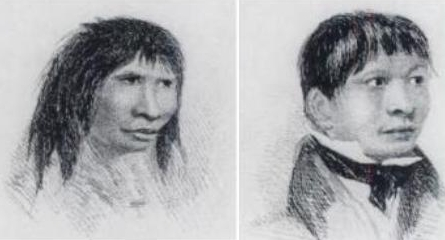
Two views of Jemmy Button from FitzRoy's Narrative (1839)

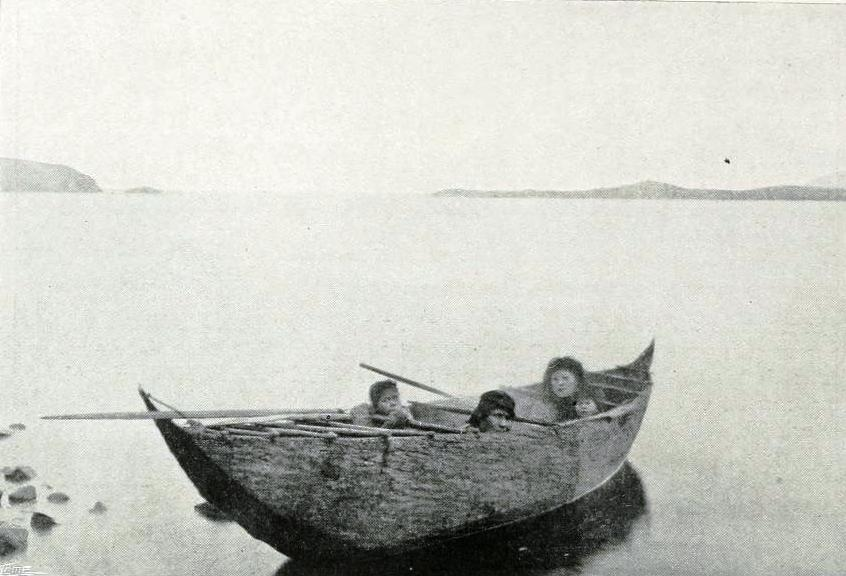
A Yagan family inside a canoe

Orundellico, known as "Jeremy Button" or "Jemmy Button" or "Jimmy Button" (c. 1815–1864), was a member of the Yahgan (or Yámana) people from islands around Tierra del Fuego in modern Chile and Argentina. He was taken to England by Captain FitzRoy in HMS Beagle and became a celebrity there for a period.

== HMS Beagle ==
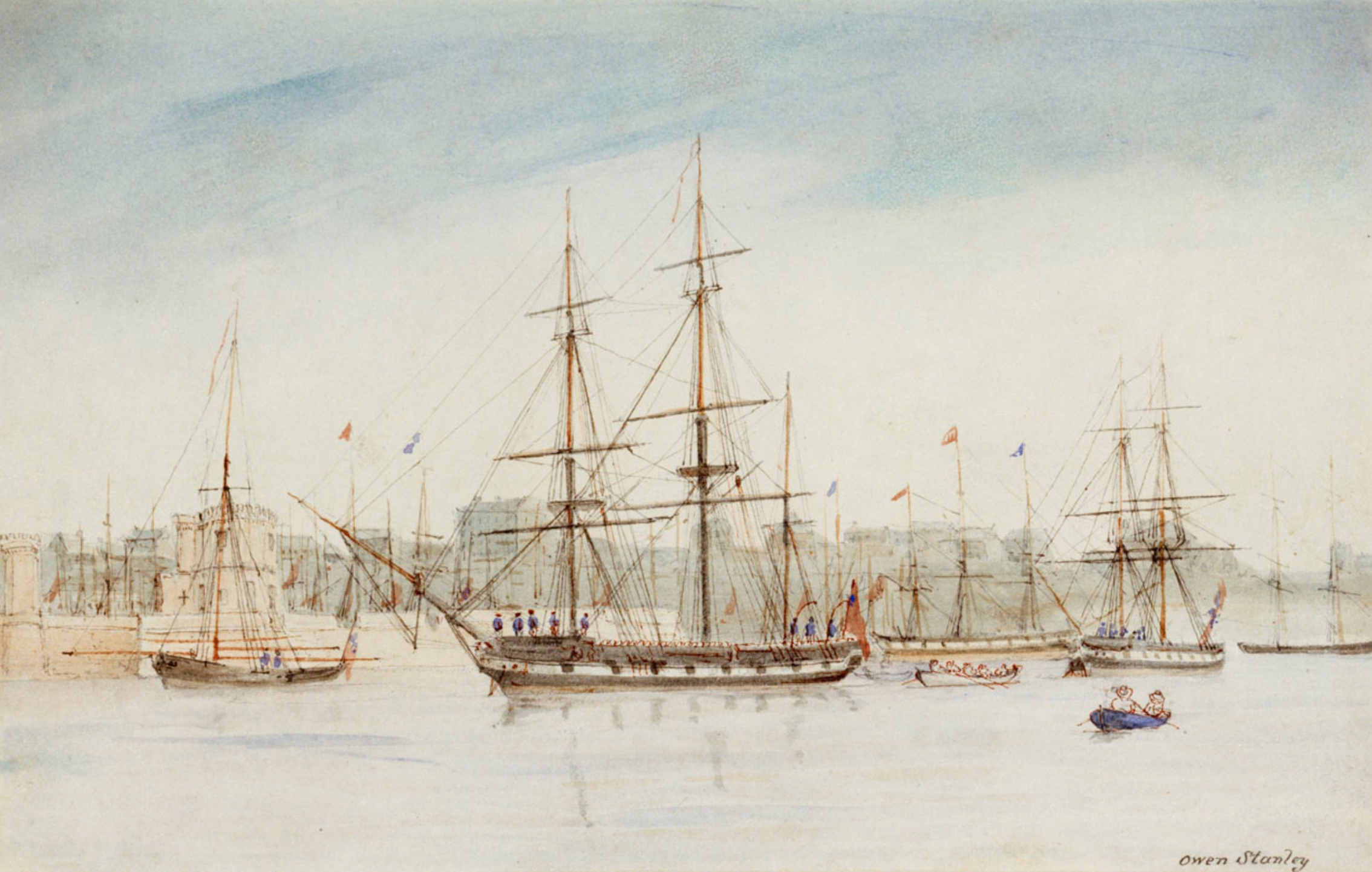
HMS Beagle (centre), watercolor by Owen Stanley (1841)

In 1830, Captain Robert FitzRoy, at the command of the first expedition of HMS Beagle, took a group of hostages from the Fuegian people after one of his ship's whaleboats was stolen. FitzRoy wrote that he bought Jemmy Button from his uncle with a mother of pearl button, hence his name. Modern historians debate if FitzRoy's claim is accurate. FitzRoy decided to take four of the young Fuegian hostages all the way to England "to become useful as interpreters, and be the means of establishing a friendly disposition towards Englishmen on the part of their countrymen." He seems to have shown great concern for the four, feeding them before his own officers and crew and intending them to be educated and Christianised so that they could improve the conditions of their kin.

The names given to the Fuegians by the crew were York Minster, Jemmy Button, Fuegia Basket (a girl) and Boat Memory. The original names of the first three were, respectively, El'leparu, O'run-del'lico, and Yok'cushly. Boat Memory died of smallpox shortly after his arrival in England and his Yaghan name is unknown.

== Arrival in England ==
The Beagle arrived back in Plymouth from her first voyage of exploration in mid-October 1830. The newspapers soon started publishing details of the Yaghan visitors and they became celebrities. In London, they met King William IV. Fuegia Basket was given a bonnet by Queen Adelaide.

== Return to Patagonia ==
One year later, Captain Fitzroy returned the three surviving Fuegians home. He took with him a young naturalist, Charles Darwin, on what was the second voyage of HMS Beagle.

After initial difficulty recalling his language and customs, Orundellico / Jemmy soon shed his European clothes and habits. A few months after his arrival, he was seen emaciated, naked save for a loincloth, and long-haired. Nevertheless, he declined the offer to return to England, which Darwin conjectured was due to the presence of his "young and nice looking wife". It appears that he and the others had taught their families some English.

== Wulaia Bay massacre ==
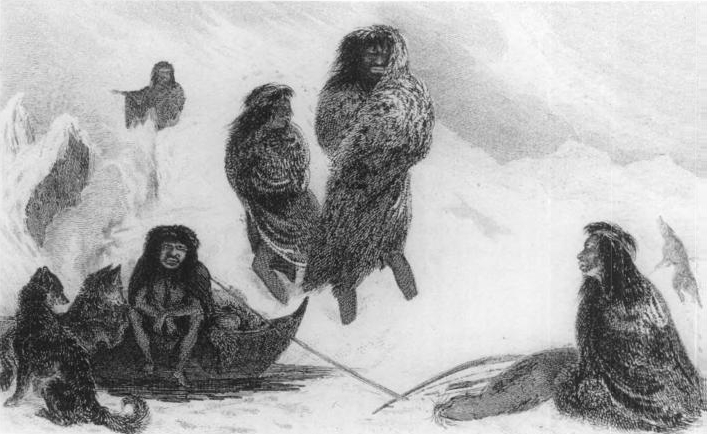
Fuegians going to trade in Zapallos with the Patagonians from FitzRoy's Narrative (1839)

In 1855, a group of Christian missionaries from the Patagonian Missionary Society visited Wulaia Bay on Navarino Island to find that Jemmy still had a remarkable grasp of English. Some time later in 1859, another group of missionaries was killed at Wulaia Bay by the Yaghan, supposedly led by Jemmy and his family. In early 1860, Jemmy visited Keppel Island and gave evidence at the enquiry held in Stanley into the massacre. He denied responsibility.

== Death ==
In 1863, the missionary Waite Stirling visited Tierra del Fuego and re-established contact with Jemmy; from then relations with the Yaghan improved. In 1866, after Jemmy's death, Stirling took one of Jemmy's sons, known as Threeboy, to England.

== Cultural references ==
=== Film ===
- The 2009 film Creation briefly recounts the story of Jemmy and the other children.
- A 2015 Chilean documentary, The Pearl Button, was named in part after the manner in which Jemmy Button was named
- Several episodes of the 1978 serial The Voyage of Charles Darwin dramatize the Fuegians' capture and their later return to Tierra del Fuego.

=== Literature ===
- According to Julia Voss, the German children's book, Jim Knopf und Lukas der Lokomotivführer by Michael Ende, translated into English as Jim Button and Luke the Engine Driver, was based on Jemmy Button. Ende, who grew up in Nazi Germany, wanted to write a story that provided a contrast to Adolf Hitler's racist ideology and misuse of Darwin's theories of evolution. Ende's 1960 novel became one of the most successful children's books in postwar Germany and won the Deutscher Jugendliteraturpreis in 1961.
- Jemmy Button appears in Argentine novelist Sylvia Iparraguirre's Tierra del Fuego, which won the 2000 Sor Juana Inés de la Cruz Prize.
- Jemmy appears in Harry Thompson's debut novel This Thing of Darkness (2005).
- Jemmy features prominently in "Notes From the Scientific Record" in James Rollins' tenth Sigma Force novel, The 6th Extinction (2014).
- Jemmy Button is the name of a novel by the Chilean writer Benjamín Subercaseaux.

=== Theater ===
- A play based on Jemmy's story premiered in Santiago, Chile on 8 April 2010.

=== Music ===
- A song entitled Jemmy Button is featured on the 2009 Darwin Song Project.

=== Podcast ===
- Is mentioned as an analogy in Case 63, Episode 7 "Jemmy Button" 2022, Gimlet

== Bibliography ==
- The Uttermost Part of the Earth by E L Bridges (1948) was republished in 2008 by Overlook Press (ISBN 978-1-58567-956-0).
- In Patagonia (1977) by Bruce Chatwin includes a fictionalised version of Orundellico's capture.
- The novel Jemmy Button by the Chilean writer Benjamin Subercaseaux was published in the 1950s and translated from Spanish by Mary and Fred del Villar (New York: The Macmilllan Company, 1954).
- La Tierra del Fuego by Sylvia Iparraguirre is another fictionalised version of the story. Winner of the Sor Juana Inés de la Cruz Prize. Translated into English by Hardie St. Martin (2000) Willamantic, CT, Curbstone Press 2000.
- Harry Thompson's This Thing of Darkness (2005) contains a fictionalised account of Jemmy's time in HMS Beagle and in England, as well as the massacre at Wulaia Bay (ISBN 0-7553-0281-8).
- Savage: The Life and Times of Jemmy Button, a full account of Jemmy's life by English writer Nick Hazlewood was published in 2000 (ISBN 0-340-73911-8).
- Three Men of the Beagle by Richard Lee Marks (ISBN 0-394-58818-5)
- Jemmy Button by Jennifer Uman & Valerio Vidali (Words by Alix Barzelay, a children's picturebook version of the story of Jemmy Button's time in England.
