= Julia Voss =

German journalist and scientific historian (born 1974)

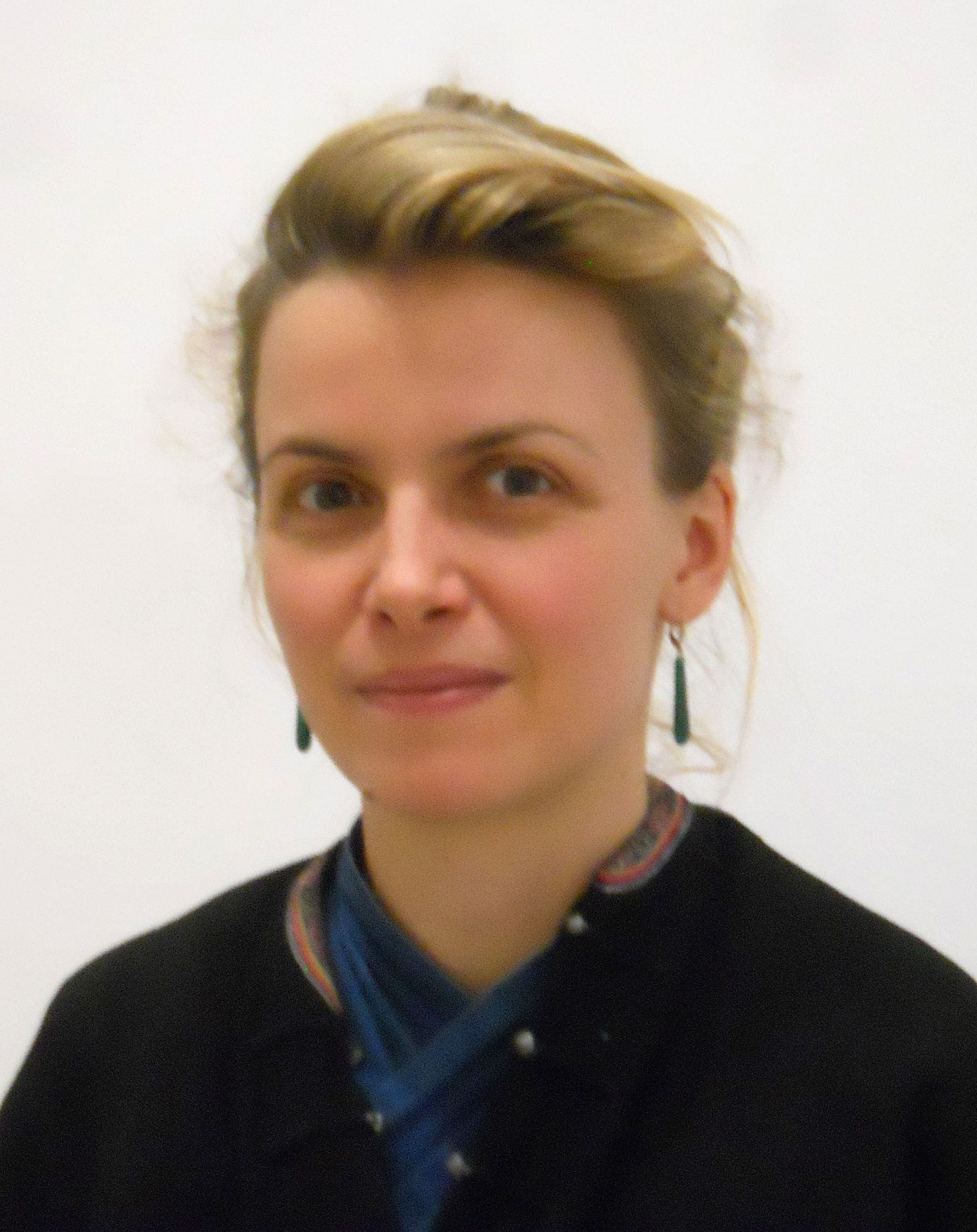
Voss in 2014

Julia Voss (born 1974) is a German journalist and scientific historian. She is a writer and art critic who works at the Frankfurter Allgemeine Zeitung.

== Early life and education ==
Voss was born in Frankfurt am Main, West Germany. She majored in modern German literature, art history and philosophy at University of Freiburg, Humboldt University in Berlin and at Goldsmiths College in London. She received her master's degree in 2000 with a thesis on the literary forms of the debate on Darwinism (Literarische Formen der Darwinismus-Debatte).

== Career ==
From 2001 to 2004, Voss pursued her art history dissertation, One long Argument. Die Darwinismus-Debatte im Bild as part of a research project at the Max Planck Institute. She examined the role of images in the development of Charles Darwin's theory of evolution. She received her doctorate at Humboldt University at the end of 2005 and was presented the Max Planck Society's Otto Hahn Award for her dissertation. Her dissertation was published in 2007. In 2008, she wrote an article about Michael Ende's children's novel, Jim Knopf und Lukas der Lokomotivführer, in which she examined Ende's motives for writing the book. Written in 1960, Ende's novel is a classic in Germany and has been translated into 33 languages. In her article, called "Jim Button saves the theory of evolution" ("Jim Knopf rettet die Evolutionstheorie"), Voss presented evidence that Ende wanted to write a contrast to Nazi racial ideology and their misuse of Darwin's theory of evolution. Ende, who had grown up in Nazi Germany, used numerous Nazi symbols and references in his book, reversing their discriminatory aspect and turning them into anti-racist and multi-cultural images. Voss' article also identified Jemmy Button as the basis for Ende's lead character, Jim Knopf, translated in English as Jim Button.

== Awards ==
Voss received the Sigmund Freud Prize for Scientific Prose from the Deutsche Akademie für Sprache und Dichtung for her study of Darwin's theory of evolution in 2009. In 2009, she also served on the jury of the Venice Biennale.

== Publications ==
- Voss, Julia (2010). Darwin's pictures: views of evolutionary theory, 1837-1874. New Haven [Conn.]: Yale University Press. ISBN 978-0-300-14174-0.
- —— (2007). Darwins Bilder (in German). Frankfurt am Main: Fischer. ISBN 978-3-596-17627-4.
- —— (2008). Charles Darwin zur Einführung (in German). Hamburg: Junius. ISBN 978-3-88506-654-5.
- —— (2009). Darwins Jim Knopf (in German). Frankfurt am Main: Fischer. ISBN 978-3-10-095805-1.
- Atlan, Eva; Gross, Raphael; —— (2013). 1938 (in German). Göttingen: Wallstein. ISBN 978-3-8353-1412-2.
- —— (2015). Hinter weißen Wänden (in German). Berlin: Merve Verlag. ISBN 978-3-88396-360-0.
- —— (24 April 2019). Hilma af Klint (in German). Frankfurt am Main: S. Fischer. ISBN 978-3-10-397367-9.
