= Edgar Ende =

German surrealist painter

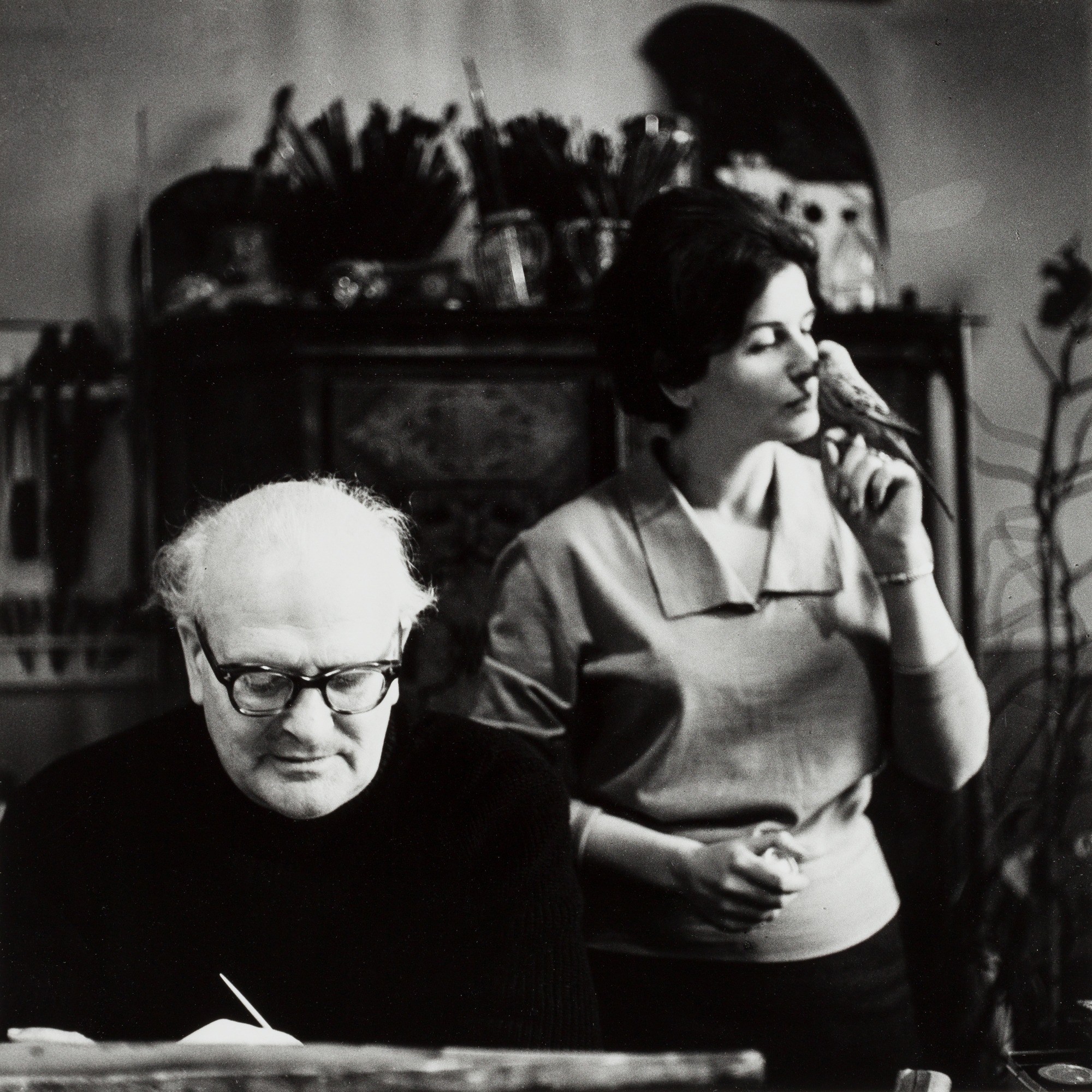
Edgar Ende and Lotte Schlegel (1961)

Edgar Karl Alfons Ende (23 February 1901 – 27 December 1965) was a German surrealist painter and father of the children's novelist Michael Ende.

Ende attended the Altona School of Arts and Crafts from 1916 to 1920. In 1922 he married Gertrude Strunck, but divorced four years later. He remarried in 1929, the same year his son Michael was born. In the 1930s Ende's Surrealist paintings began to attract considerable critical attention, but were then condemned as degenerate by the Nazi government. Beginning in 1936 the Nazis forbade him to continue to paint or exhibit his work. In 1940 he was conscripted into the Luftwaffe as an operator of anti-aircraft artillery.

The majority of his paintings were destroyed by a bomb raid on Munich in 1944, making his surviving pre-war work extremely rare. In 1951, Ende met the recognized founder of Surrealism, André Breton, who admired his work and declared him an official Surrealist. He continued to paint surrealist works until his death in 1965 from a myocardial infarction.

Ende's paintings are thought to have had a significant influence on his son's writing. This is inferred in the scenes depicting the surreal dream-paintings from Yor's Minroud in Die Unendliche Geschichte (The Neverending Story), and is made explicit in Michael Ende's book Der Spiegel im Spiegel (The mirror in the mirror), a collection of short stories based on (and printed alongside) Edgar Ende's surrealist works.

== See also ==
- List of German painters
