= Yokcushlu =

Kawésqar woman (c. 1821 – c. 1883)

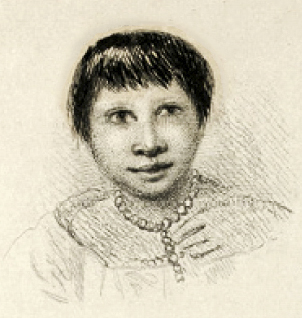
A sketch of Yokcushlu from 1833

Yokcushlu (c. 1821 – c. 1883) was a Kawésqar woman from the western Tierra del Fuego. In 1830, at the age of nine, she was taken hostage by the crew of the British vessel HMS Beagle and renamed "Fuegia Basket". Robert FitzRoy, captain of the Beagle, initially intended to trade her for a stolen boat. He later decided to take her and three other Fuegians, "York Minster", "Boat Memory", and "Jemmy Button", to England where they could be educated and taught Christianity so that they might return to "civilise" their people and serve as interpreters for the British.

Yokcushlu survived the voyage to England and was educated in English and Christianity. She appeared at court before King William IV and Queen Adelaide. In late 1831, Yokcushlu embarked on the second voyage of HMS Beagle, where one of her fellow passengers was Charles Darwin. She was married to her fellow captive Elleparu ("York Minster") and returned to Tierra del Fuego where they were left on Navarino Island. She had two children with Elleparu and later visited the Ushuaia Anglican mission where she recounted her story to Thomas Bridges.

== Early life and capture ==
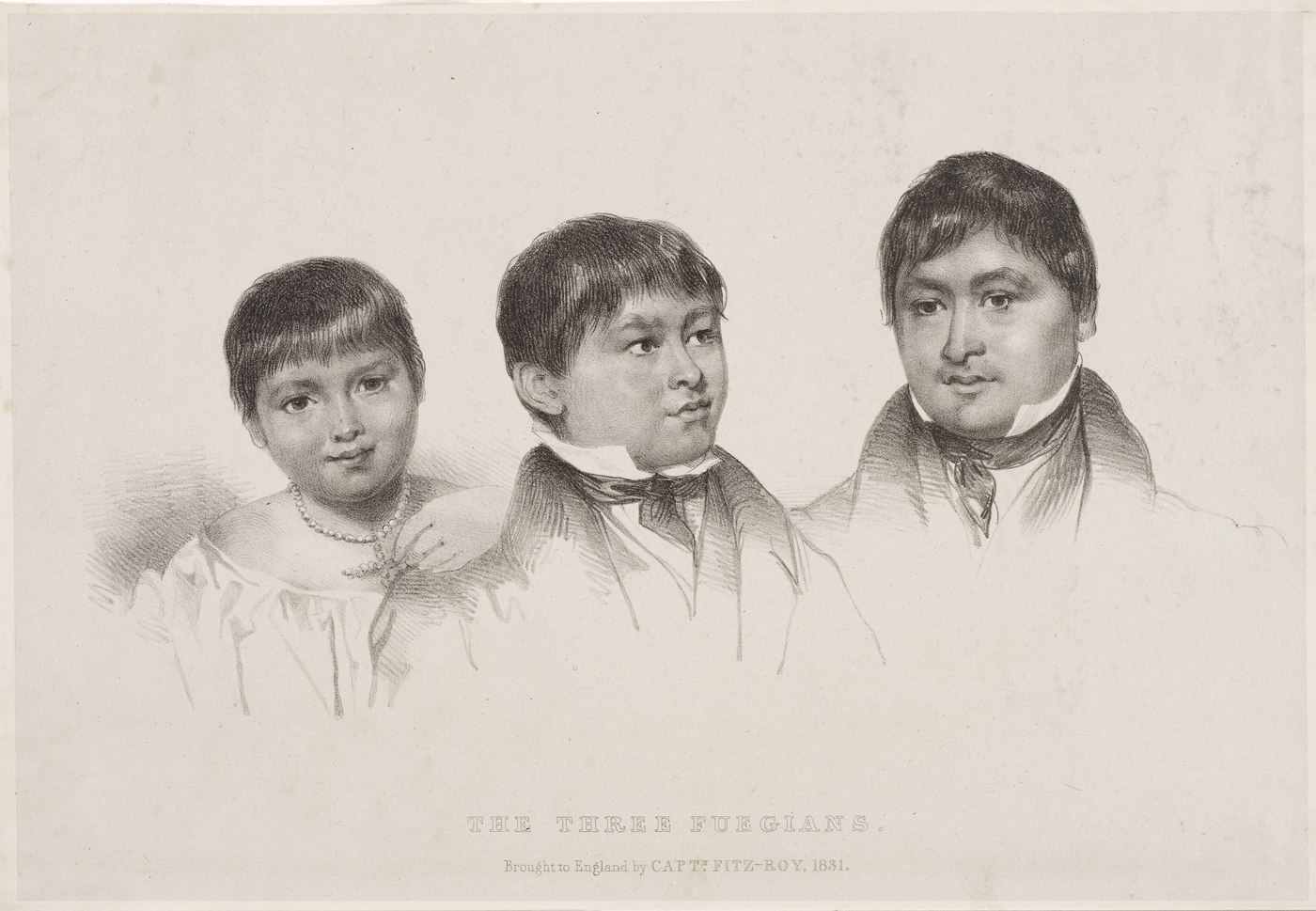
The three captive Fuegians who were taken to England on HMS Beagle: Yokcushlu (left), Orundellico, and Elleparu. Lithograph c. 1831, probably by John Hayter.

Yokcushlu was born around 1821 to a Kawésqar family that lived in western Tierra del Fuego. Robert FitzRoy, captain of HMS Beagle was on a surveying mission around Tierra del Fuego in February 1830. Yokcushlu was about nine years old when the British captured her. Initially, FitzRoy and his men took several Fuegians hostage with the intention of trading them for a small survey boat that had allegedly been stolen. All of the hostages escaped except for three children, including Yokcushlu. FitzRoy kept only her as hostage because he wanted to teach her English and he wrote that she seemed healthy and happy. He then decided to take the captives to England where they could be educated and then returned to civilise their communities. The crew of the Beagle renamed the captives. The 26-year-old Elleparu was given the name "York Minster", a 20-year-old was named "Boat Memory", and the 14-year-old boy Orundellico was named "Jemmy Button" because he had been purchased for a button. Yokcushlu was named "Fuegia Basket" because the men whose boat had been stolen had to build a makeshift coracle-like basket to get back to the Beagle. (Note: Other accounts say that the name "Fuegia Basket" was for her homeland and her only possession.)

On its voyage to England, the Beagle stopped in Montevideo, where Yokcushlu was vaccinated against smallpox and stayed with an English family. In Falmouth Harbour on the southern coast of Antigua, she was reportedly terrified after seeing a steamship.

== Life in England ==
After HMS Beagle arrived in Plymouth in September 1830, "Boat Memory" died of smallpox at the Royal Naval Hospital. Yokcushlu was exposed to measles so that she might gain immunity. FitzRoy offered the captives to the British government, who did not take responsibility for them but agreed to provide assistance and a return voyage to Tierra del Fuego. The Fuegians were placed in the Church Mission Society to be "civilised" and "taught the truths of Christianity". Yokcushlu, Orundellico, and Elleparu were sent to Walthamstow, where for ten months they were educated by the Reverend William Wilson, a schoolmaster, and his spouse. In addition to lessons in religion and the English language, they were taught gardening, husbandry, and the use of common tools. Captain FitzRoy, who was an aficionado of phrenology, had the heads of the three captives examined. Yokcushlu was pronounced "the most likely to become a useful member of society".

The three captives were granted an audience before the court during the summer of 1831. FitzRoy was questioned by King William IV about the Fuegians' lives, while Queen Adelaide was taken with Yokcushlu, gifting her a ring, one of her own bonnets, and money to purchase clothing.

FitzRoy was shocked when Elleparu and Yokcushlu were discovered having sex in a corner of the mission school, and was worried about the reaction of British people should Yokcushlu become pregnant. Thinking the "savages" were a demoralising factor, he advised the Admiralty that he was determined to return the captives to Tierra del Fuego.

== Second voyage of the Beagle ==
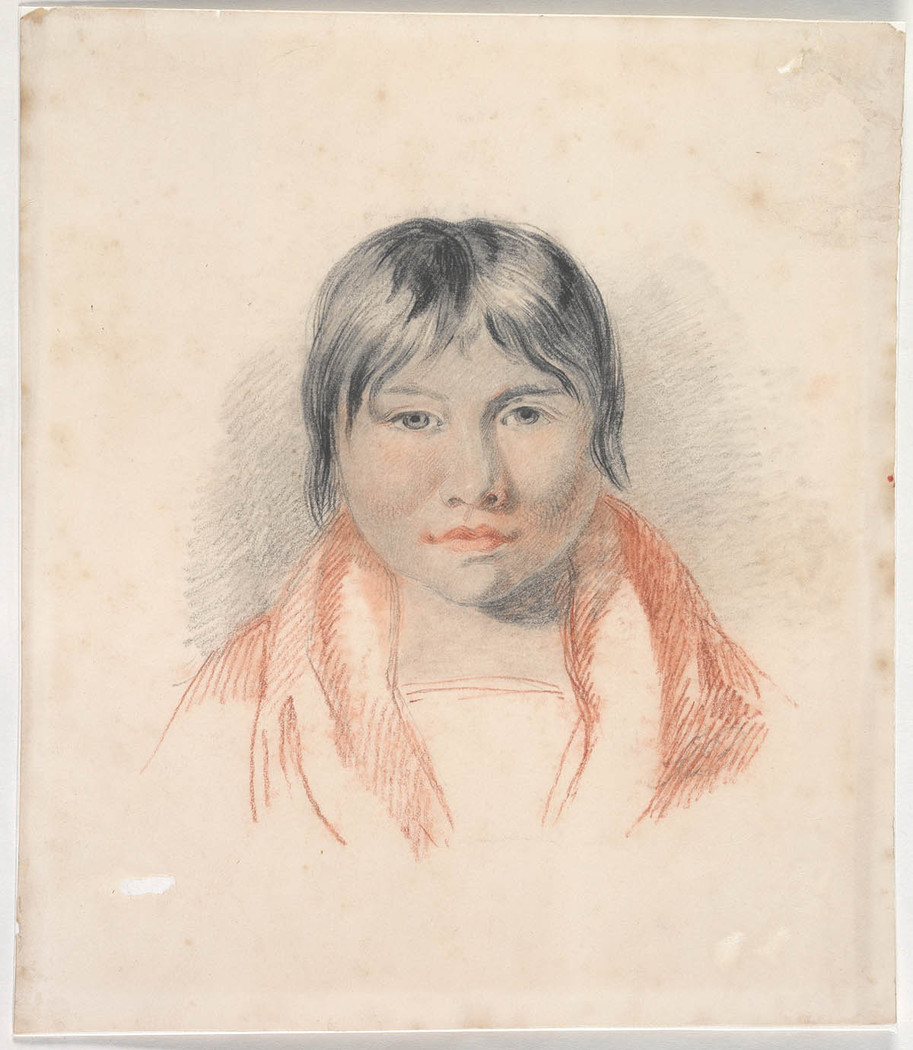
Portrait of a woman, possibly Yokcushlu, from Album of Pencil sketches, watercolours, etc.

On 27 December 1831, Yokcushlu, Elleparu, and Orundellico departed England on the second voyage of HMS Beagle. The voyage was captained once again by FitzRoy, and Charles Darwin was serving as a naturalist for the expedition. During the year-long voyage south, Yokcushlu learned some Portuguese and Spanish. In his journal, Darwin described her as a "nice, modest, reserved young girl, with a rather pleasing but sometimes sullen expression". He characterised her as a quick learner and wrote that Elleparu was jealous of any attention directed towards Yokcushlu, who he intended to marry. During the voyage, Yokcushlu was married to Elleparu. The Beagle stopped for three months in Rio de Janeiro and Yokcushlu stayed with an expatriate family there. She taught their children English while she learned Portuguese.

Due to poor weather, all three Fuegians were left on Navarino Island, where Orundellico had relations. Elleparu left the island with Yokcushlu on a canoe he had built, taking the supplies that were left for them. When the Beagle returned in 1834, the English crew encountered Orundellico. According to Darwin's journal, Orundellico said he had been tricked by Elleparu, who had taken all of his belongings. FitzRoy later wrote that whaling boat captains reported that Yokcushlu would climb aboard their vessels to spend the night. Explorer William Parker Snow reported that Yokcushlu and Elleparu were seen in 1851.

== Later life and legacy ==
Yokcushlu had two children with Elleparu. After he died, she married a younger man. In 1873, she paid a visit to the Ushuaia Mission in the Beagle Channel. Though she had forgotten much of her English, she spoke to Anglican missionary Thomas Bridges. She recounted her experiences on the Beagle and the death of Elleparu. Bridges encountered her again in 1883 when he travelled to the western part of Tierra del Fuego. Yokcushlu was said to be "frail and unhappy, nearing the end of her life".

A street in Ushuaia, Argentina is named Fuegia Basket for her.

== See also ==
- List of kidnappings
