= Charles Darwin bibliography =

Writings of the English scientist

Illustration by John Gould of Darwin's finches

This is a list of the writings of Charles Darwin.

== Works published during lifetime ==
- 1829–1832. [Records of captured insects, in] Stephens, J. F., Illustrations of British entomology
- 1835: Extracts from Letters to Henslow (Read at a meeting of the Cambridge Philosophical Society on 16 November 1835, with comments by John Stevens Henslow and Adam Sedgwick, and printed for private distribution dated 1 December 1835. Selected remarks had been read by Sedgwick to the Geological Society of London on 18 November 1835, and these were summarised in Proceedings of the Geological Society published in 1836. Further extracts were published in the Entomological Magazine and, with a review, in the Magazine of Natural History. A reprint was issued in 1960, again for private distribution.)
- 1836: A LETTER, Containing Remarks on the Moral State of TAHITI, NEW ZEALAND, &c. – BY CAPT. R. FITZROY AND C. DARWIN, ESQ. OF H.M.S. 'Beagle.'
- 1838–1843: Zoology of the Voyage of H.M.S. Beagle: published between 1839 and 1843 in five Parts (and nineteen numbers) by various authors, edited and superintended by Charles Darwin, who contributed sections to two of the Parts:
  - 1838: Part 1 No. 1 Fossil Mammalia, by Richard Owen (Preface and Geological introduction by Darwin)
  - 1838: Part 2 No. 1 Mammalia, by George R. Waterhouse (Geographical introduction and A notice of their habits and ranges by Darwin)
- 1839: Questions About the Breeding of Animals
- 1839: Journal and Remarks (The Voyage of the Beagle) (Second edition: 1845)
- 1841: The Gardeners' Chronicle (contributor)
- 1842: The Structure and Distribution of Coral Reefs (Second edition: 1874)
- 1844: Geological Observations on the Volcanic Islands visited during the voyage of H.M.S. Beagle (Second edition: 1876)
- 1846: Geological Observations on South America
- 1849: Geology from A Manual of scientific enquiry; prepared for the use of Her Majesty's Navy: and adapted for travellers in general., John F.W. Herschel ed.
- 1851: A Monograph of the Sub-class Cirripedia, with Figures of all the Species. The Lepadidae; or, Pedunculated Cirripedes.
- 1851: A Monograph on the Fossil Lepadidae, or, Pedunculated Cirripedes of Great Britain
- 1854: A Monograph of the Sub-class Cirripedia, with Figures of all the Species. The Balanidae (or Sessile Cirripedes); the Verrucidae, etc.
- 1854: A Monograph on the Fossil Balanidæ and Verrucidæ of Great Britain
- 1858: On the Tendency of Species to form Varieties; and on the Perpetuation of Varieties and Species by Natural Means of Selection (Extract from an unpublished Work on Species)
- 1859: On the Origin of Species by Means of Natural Selection, or the Preservation of Favoured Races in the Struggle for Life (Second edition: 1860, Third edition: 1861, Fourth edition: 1866, Fifth edition: 1869, Sixth edition: 1872)
- 1862: On the various contrivances by which British and foreign orchids are fertilised by insects (Second edition: 1877)
- 1865: The Movements and Habits of Climbing Plants (Linnean Society paper, published in book form in 1875) (Illustrated by George Darwin
- 1868: The Variation of Animals and Plants Under Domestication (2 volumes) (Second edition: 1875, edited by Francis Darwin in 1905)
- 1871: The Descent of Man, and Selection in Relation to Sex (2 volumes) (Second edition: 1874, assisted by George Darwin and Thomas Henry Huxley, revised and augmented second edition: 1877)
- 1872: The Expression of the Emotions in Man and Animals (revised by Francis Darwin in 1890, restored and revised edition edited by Paul Ekman in 1999)
- 1875: Insectivorous Plants (Second edition edited by Francis Darwin with footnotes and additions in 1888)
- 1876: The Effects of Cross and Self Fertilisation in the Vegetable Kingdom (Second edition: 1878)
- 1877: The Different Forms of Flowers on Plants of the Same Species (Second edition with a preface by Francis Darwin in 1884)
- 1879: "Preface and 'a preliminary notice'" in Ernst Krause's Erasmus Darwin
- 1880: The Power of Movement in Plants
- 1881: The Formation of Vegetable Mould through the Action of Worms (corrections by Francis Darwin in 1882)

== Posthumous First Publications ==
- 1975: Natural Selection; being the second part of his big species book written from 1856 to 1858, edited by Robert C. Stauffer, Cambridge: Cambridge University Press. Corrections by John van Wyhe (2007)
- 2009 (collection): Charles Darwin's shorter publications 1829-1883, with a foreword by Janet Browne & Jim Secord (edited by John van Wyhe)

=== Autobiography ===
- 1887: Autobiography of Charles Darwin (edited by his son Francis Darwin)
- 1958: Autobiography of Charles Darwin (Nora Barlow, unexpurgated)

=== Correspondence ===
- 1887: Life and Letters of Charles Darwin (ed. Francis Darwin) (3 volumes)
- 1903: More Letters of Charles Darwin (2 volumes) (ed. Francis Darwin and A.C. Seward)
- 1974-December 2022: Correspondence of Charles Darwin (30 volumes)
