= The Power of Movement in Plants =

Book about tropism published by Charles Darwin in 1880

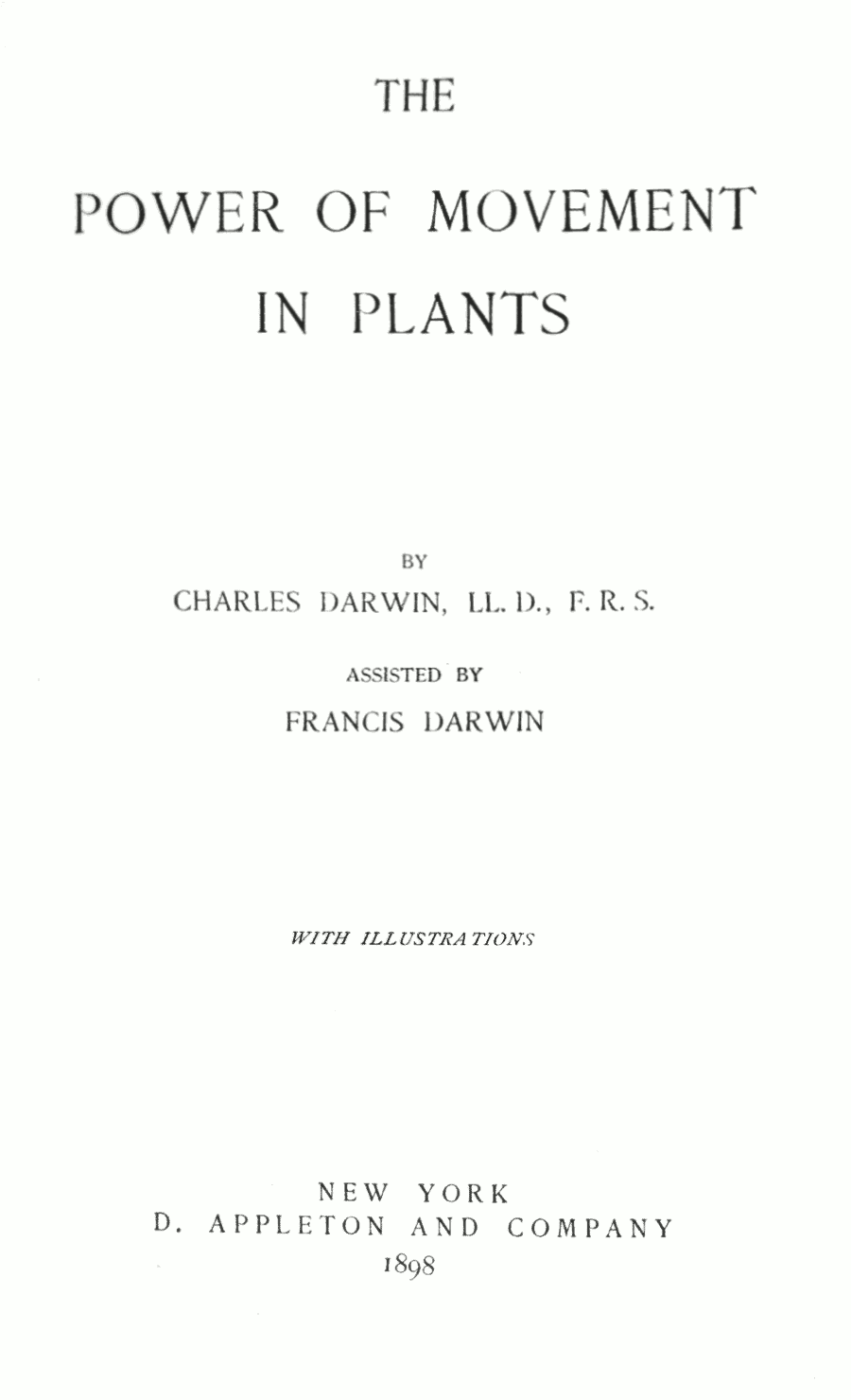

The Power of Movement in Plants is a book by Charles Darwin on phototropism and other types of movement in plants. This book continues his work in producing evidence for his theory of natural selection. As it was one of his last books, followed only by the publication of The Formation of Vegetable Mould through the Action of Worms, he was assisted by his son Francis in conducting the necessary experiments and preparing the manuscript. The Power of Movement in Plants was published 6 November 1880, and 1500 copies were quickly sold by publisher John Murray.

This book stands at the culmination of a long line of study in plants and is immediately preceded by 'The different forms of flowers on Plants of the same species’ (1877). (See Bibliography for additional publications on plants.) These studies on plants were first evidenced in 'On the various contrivances by which British and foreign orchids are fertilised by insects’ (1862), the publication that immediately followed On the Origin of Species By Means of Natural Selection.

He co-authored this study with his son Francis Darwin (who specialised in botany) and his devotee, George Romanes, who assisted in editing the work. The work was begun in earnest late in 1877, after his work on climbing plants (1875) and insectivorous plants (1875) stimulated his interest in the subject. At times, Darwin despaired of ever finishing the work, as the book outgrew his original expectations:

I have written a rather big book—more is the pity—on the movements of plants, and I am now just beginning to go over the MS. for the second time, which is a horrid bore.

As the book neared completion, he summarised its underlying viewpoint:

My MS. relates to the movements of plants, and I think that I have succeeded in showing that all the more important great classes of movements are due to the modification of a kind of movement common to all parts of all plants from their earliest youth.

The work concerns itself with how plants respond to external stimuli and examines these processes in individual plants to gain understanding of some general principles governing their growth and life. This continues Darwin’s work of elucidating how natural selection works and specifically how plants have adapted to differing environments whilst at the same time answering some objections of his day that evolution could not account for changes in behavioural responses. In his conclusions, Darwin presents the key features of plants from an evolutionary perspective indicating that gradual modification of these processes in response to natural selective forces like light and water could enable extensive ability to adapt.

The process that creates the circular or elliptical movement of the stem and tips of plants (circumnutation) was identified as a significant one in enabling plants to evolve and adapt to almost any environment on the planet. Darwin also drew attention to the similarities between animals and plants, e.g., sensitivity to touch (thigmotropism), light sensitivity (phototropism), and gravity (geotropism). Darwin used various methods of enquiry: usually setting up rigorous controlled experiments which are clearly explained in the text, reporting the results and then drawing general conclusions. Studies of nyctinasty were particularly burdensome, to Darwin's rest as well as to the plants:

I think we have proved that the sleep of plants is to lessen the injury to the leaves from radiation. This has interested me much, and has cost us great labour, as it has been a problem since the time of Linnaeus. But we have killed or badly injured a multitude of plants.

== Content ==
The book is divided into the following chapters, each of which describes types of movements based on Darwin's specific experiments and their results.

- Chapter 1: The Circumnutating Movements of Seedling Plants
- Chapter 2: General Considerations of the Movements and Growth of Seedling Plants
- Chapter 3: Sensitiveness of the Apex of the Radicle to Contact and to other Irritants
- Chapter 4: The Circumnutating Movements of the several parts of Mature Plants
- Chapter 5: Modified Circumnutation: Climbing Plants; Epinastic and Hyponastic Movements
- Chapter 6: Modified Circumnutation: Sleep or Nyctitropic Movements, Their Use: Sleep of Cotyledons
- Chapter 7: Modified Circumnutation: Nyctitropic or Sleep Movements of Leaves
- Chapter 8: Modified Circumnutation: Movements excited by Light
- Chapter 9: Sensitiveness of Plants to Light: its transmitted effects
- Chapter 10: Modified Circumnutation: Movements excited by Gravitation
- Chapter 11: Localised Sensitiveness to Gravitation, and its Transmitted Effects
- Chapter 12: Summary and Concluding Remarks

== Reception and influence ==
According to Darwin's son Francis, the book was "widely reviewed and excited much interest among the general public." A lead article in the London Times on 20 November 1880, generated notes from acquaintances and friends. The book received critical review by botanist Dr. Julius Wiesner of the University of Vienna.

In the Preface to the Da Capo Press Edition of the original book, Pickard asserts that "If asked to choose the scientific report which most clearly marks the beginning of the modern study of plant growth, a great many botanists would select Charles Darwin's The Power of Movement in Plants." She reviews the influence of Darwin's techniques here on later research by Boysen Jensen, Frits Went, and others that ultimately led to the discovery of auxin as the growth principle and notes that Darwin pioneered the use of the coleoptile (which in Darwin's time was called a cotyledon) in plant growth studies.
