= Geological Observations on the Volcanic Islands =

1844 book by Charles Darwin

Geological Observations on the Volcanic Islands, visited during the Voyage of H.M.S. Beagle
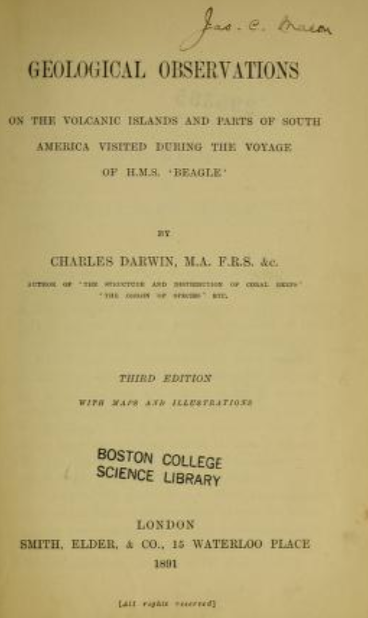
- Title page for Geological Observations on the Volcanic Islands, visited during the Voyage of H.M.S. Beagle (3rd edition, 1891)
- Author: Charles Darwin
- Language: English
- Genre: Geology
- Publication date: 1844
- Media type: Book

Geological Observations on the Volcanic Islands, visited during the Voyage of H.M.S. Beagle is a book written by the English naturalist Charles Darwin. The book was published in 1844 and is based on his travels during the second voyage of HMS Beagle, commanded by captain Robert FitzRoy. It is the second book in a series of geology books written by Darwin that also includes The Structure and Distribution of Coral Reefs (published in 1842) and Geological Observations on South America (published in 1846).

The text contains seven chapters, and includes observations made during Darwin's travels to the volcanic island of St. Jago in Cape Verde, the Fernando de Noronha archipelago, Ascension Island, the island of Saint Helena, the Galápagos Islands, James Island, New Zealand, Australia, Van Diemen's Land, and the Cape of Good Hope.

The book includes one of the earliest accounts of the process of magmatic differentiation. While observing a basaltic lava flow in the Galápagos Islands, Darwin observed that "crystals sink from their weight" (Note: On p. 117 of his Geological Observations on the Volcanic Islands … (1844), Darwin noted the precipitation of albite crystals within basaltic lava on Santiago Island (or "James Island") of the Galápagos Islands. He then cited a work by "von Buch" (German geologist and paleontologist Christian Leopold von Buch (1774–1853)): Physikalische Beschreibung der canarischen Inseln [Physical description of the Canary Islands] (Berlin, 1825), which was translated into French as: Léopold von Buch, with C. Boulanger, trans., Description physique des Îles Canaries (Paris, France: F. G. Levrault, 1836). Darwin cited pp. 190–191 of that translation, where Buch mentions a similar geological formation on the island of Tenerife in the Canary Islands and where he mentions a "M. de Drée", who had found experimentally that feldspar crystals form and precipitate in molten lava: "Les expériences de M. de Drée, dans lesquelles il a fait fondre diverses laves dans un creuset, ont prouvé que dans une telle masse fluide, les cristaux de feldspath devaient tendre à se précipiter au fond." (The experiments of M. de Drée, in which he melted various lavas in a crucible, proved that in such a fluid mass, crystals of feldspar should tend to precipitate to the bottom.) "M. de Drée" was Étienne-Marie-Gilbert, Marquis de Drée (1760–1848) [ Fr ], a French amateur geologist who in 1808 had presented to L'Institut national de France his paper "Mémoire sur un nouveau genre de liquéfaction ignée qui explique la formation des laves lithoïdes" (Memoir on a new type of igneous liquefaction that explains the formation of stony lavas). (Summarized (in French) in: Etienne-Marie-Gilbert Drée (1808 March 28) "Mémoire sur un nouveau genre de liquéfaction ignée qui explique la formation des laves lithoïdes," Nouveau Bulletin des Sciences, 1 : 137–142.) On pp. 16–17 of the memoir, Drée stated: "En plaçant le morceau de porphyre dans le creuset no. 6, je suis certain que ce morceau touchoit au fond du creuset, et cependant on voit dans le produit tous les cristaux réunis dans la partie supérieure, preuve que la liquéfaction a été assez complète pour permettre l'élévation des cristaux de feld-spath (1)." (In placing the piece of porphyry in crucible number 6, I'm certain that that piece touched the bottom of the crucible, and yet one sees in the product all of the crystals clustered in the upper part — proof that the liquefaction was complete enough to permit the rising [i.e., floating] of the crystals of feldspar ^{(1)}.) Thus, although Drée had expected the feldspar crystals to float, they instead sank to the bottom of the molten lava — just as had happened in the lavas of James Island and Tenerife.) and that this "throws light on the separation of the high silica versus low silica series of rocks." This was the first proposal of the fractional crystallization hypothesis of magma differentiation that was further developed and demonstrated in the 20th century.

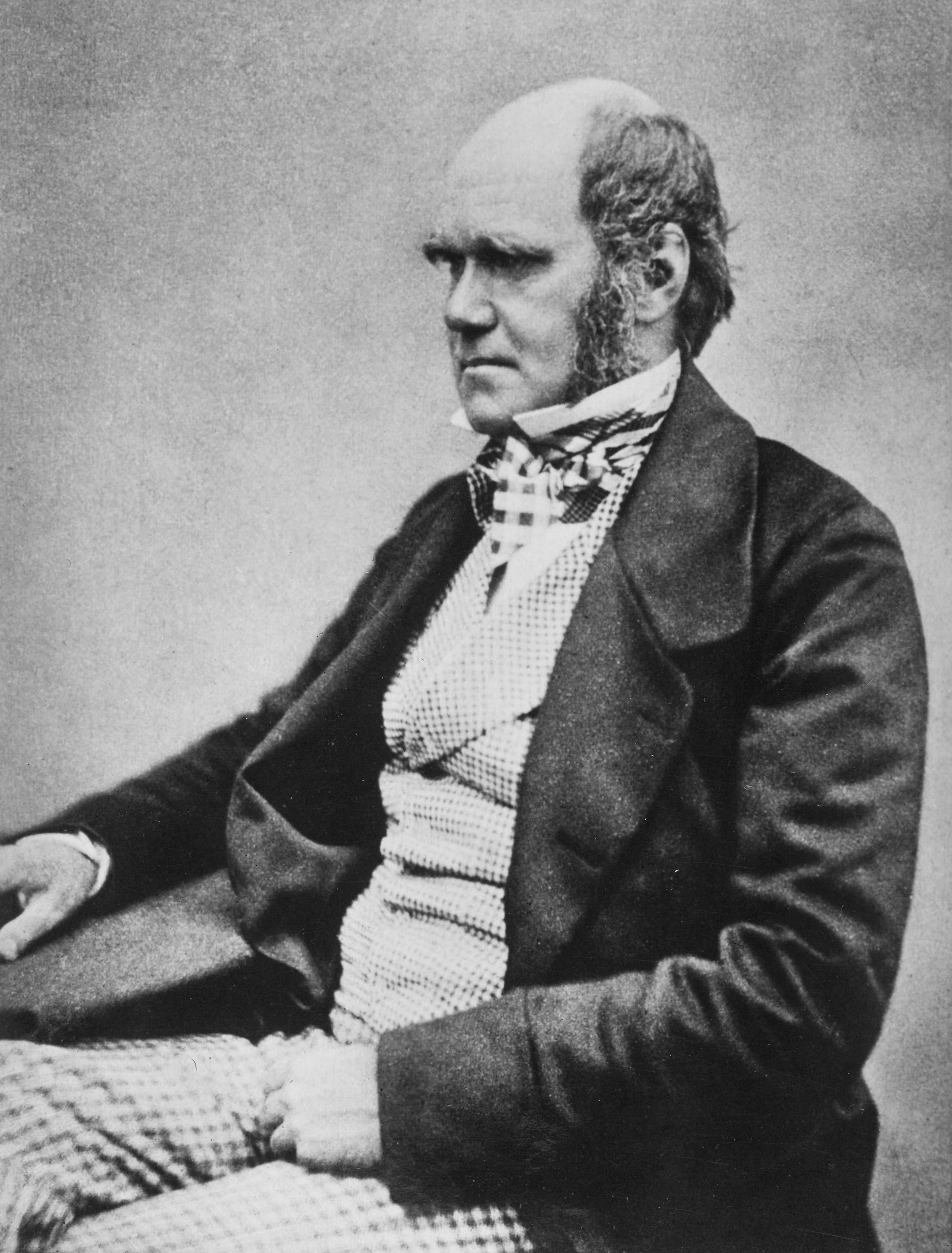
Charles Darwin wrote Geological Observations on the Volcanic Islands as part of a series of books on geology.

The geologist Archibald Geikie praised the book, calling it "the best authority on the general geological structure of most of the regions it describes," and that Darwin was "one of the earliest writers to recognize the magnitude of denudation to which even recent geological accumulations have been subjected."

A second edition of the book, published in 1876, combines Geological Observations on the Volcanic Islands with Geological Observations on South America.
