= Geological Observations on South America =

1846 book by Charles Darwin

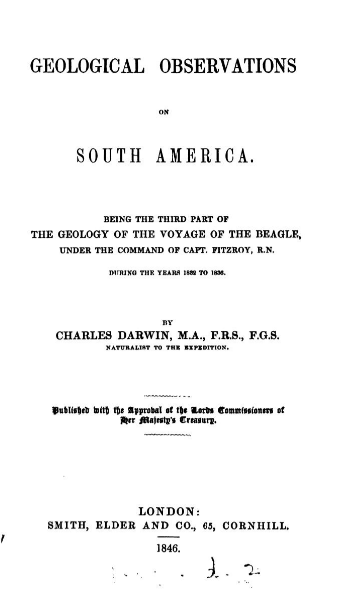
- Title page for Geological Observations on South America (1846)
- Author: Charles Darwin
- Language: English
- Genre: Geology
- Publication date: 1846
- Media type: Book

Geological Observations on South America is a book written by the English naturalist Charles Darwin. The book was published in 1846 and is based on his travels during the second voyage of HMS Beagle, commanded by captain Robert FitzRoy. HMS Beagle arrived in South America to map out the coastlines and islands of the region for the British Navy. On the journey, Darwin collected fossils and plants and recorded the continent's geological features.

It is the third book in a series of geology books written by Darwin, which also includes The Structure and Distribution of Coral Reefs, published in 1842, and Geological Observations on the Volcanic Islands visited during the Voyage of H.M.S. Beagle, published in 1844. It took Darwin four years to write and complete the entire series, from 1842 to 1846. According to his diaries, Geological Observations of South America was written between July 1844 to April 1845.

The text contains eight chapters along with appendices on Darwin's Mesozoic and Tertiary fossils. It describes his travels through the regions of modern Chile, Brazil, and Argentina, including the Pampas, Patagonia, and the Andes. With this book Darwin became the first to describe and name Navidad Formation, the reference unit for the marine Neogene in Chile. Darwin established relatives ages for rock units in the high Andes near Portillo. Metamorphic rocks were older than intruding red granites found in the area. By establishing, with aid of fossils, a Cretaceous age for some strata in the high Andes Darwin set time constrains for uplift of the Andes. He did further posited that the western part of the Andes (hinterland) rose before the eastern part, an idea later verified to be correct not only for the part of the Andes he visited but for orogenic mountains in general.

Darwin, in a letter to the geologist Charles Lyell, wrote that the book was "dreadfully dull, yet much condensed." He put a great deal of effort into writing the book, but sardonically commented that "geologists never read each other's works, and that the only object in writing a book is a proof of earnestness, and that you do not form your opinions without undergoing labour of some kind."

In the book, Darwin voiced sceptical support for the "crater of elevation" theory. The theory proposed that volcanoes were not the product of lavas, but are pushed up from within. Darwin later rejected the theory when sufficient evidence was demonstrated by the geologist Charles Lyell to disprove it.

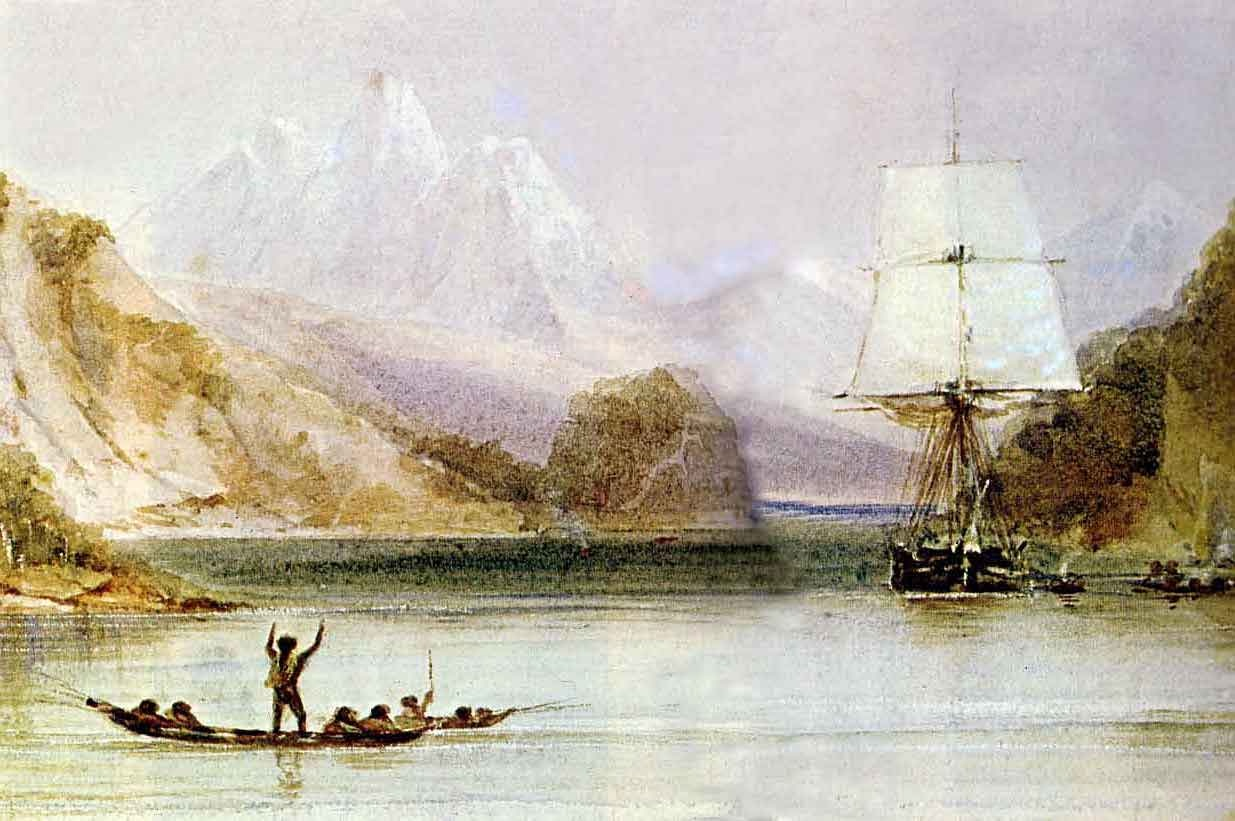
Geological Observations on South America is based on Darwin's travels during the second voyage of HMS Beagle.

Francis Darwin, a botanist and the son of Charles Darwin, wrote that the book was significant for the "evidence which it brought forward to prove the slow interrupted elevation of the South American continent during a recent geological period." Darwin's geological work is not considered as notable as his work is biology, but nevertheless was important in advancing "the general reception of Lyell's teaching."
