= On the Movements and Habits of Climbing Plants =

1875 book by Charles Darwin in

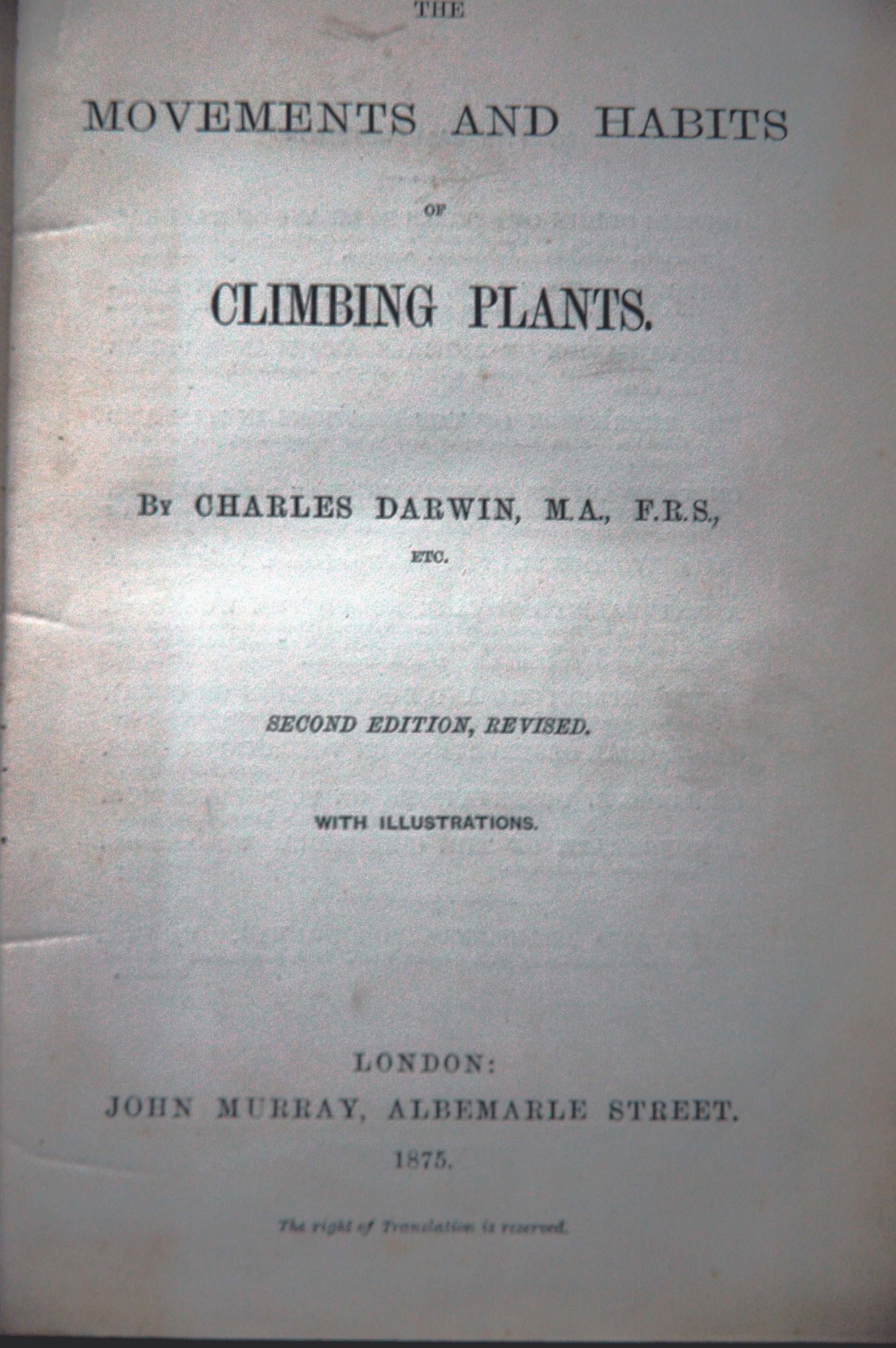
Front cover of 1875 edition of Darwin's Movements and Habits of Climbing Plants

On the Movements and Habits of Climbing Plants is a book by Charles Darwin first printed in book form in 1875 by John Murray. Originally, the text appeared as an essay in the 9th volume of the Journal of the Linnean Society, therefore the first edition in book form is actually called the ‘second edition, revised.’ Illustrations were drawn by Charles Darwin’s son, George Darwin.

Following the 1859 publication of Origin of Species Darwin set out to produce evidence for his theory of natural selection. Initially Darwin spent much time in studying plants to achieve this aim. This book stands second in line to his first work on plants, On the various contrivances by which British and foreign orchids are fertilised by insects. (1862)

This work is subdivided into chapters concentrating on a particular type of climber which he divided into four main classes but Darwin, in this volume, concentrates on the two main classes, the twining plants and the leaf climbers (divided into two sub-divisions: leaf climbers and tendril bearers)

The following comprise the chapters: 1. Twining plants 2. Leaf climbers 3 & 4.Tendril bearers 5. Hook and Root climbers.

== Context ==
Inspired by reading an 1858 short paper by his friend Asa Gray on the movements of tendrils, Darwin set up experiments to explore the development of so many kinds of climbing plants in an evolutionary context. The concept of the power of movement in plants (‘spontaneous revolutions of the stems...’ p. 1) had already been observed as he acknowledges in the first chapter. His conclusions in his last plant book, The Power of Movement in Plants are key here: i.e. that circumnutation (the process that creates the circular or elliptical movement of the stem and tips of plants) was central in the development of multitudes of adaptations to the environment and thus resulting in an immense variety of plants. The climbing habit evolved from this basic power of movement. Darwin conducted, in his own words, "observations, founded on the examination of above a hundred widely distinct living species." This, he maintained, "contain sufficient novelty to justify me publishing them."

== Conclusions ==
The spontaneous revolving habit of stems and tips has evolved in many plant groups in order to obtain light and/or support. Darwin in his conclusion explores the reasons for why these adaptations might have taken place, in what ways they may have been advantageous. For instance, an increased ability to hold on to support (by twining) will be beneficial in windy environments. In tall and dense forests, twining plants would probably succeed better with minor expenditure of organic matter. All this evolved due to an inherent ability to respond to their ‘wants’ by moving. (p. 202). Darwin states: "It has often been vaguely asserted that plants are distinguished from animals by not having the power of movement. It should rather be said that plants acquire and display this power only when it is of some advantage to them; this being of comparatively rare occurrence, as they are affixed to the ground, and food is brought to them by the air and rain." (p. 206).
