= The Formation of Vegetable Mould Through the Action of Worms =

Charles Darwin's last scientific book, 1881

The Formation of Vegetable Mould Through the Action of Worms, with Observations on their Habits
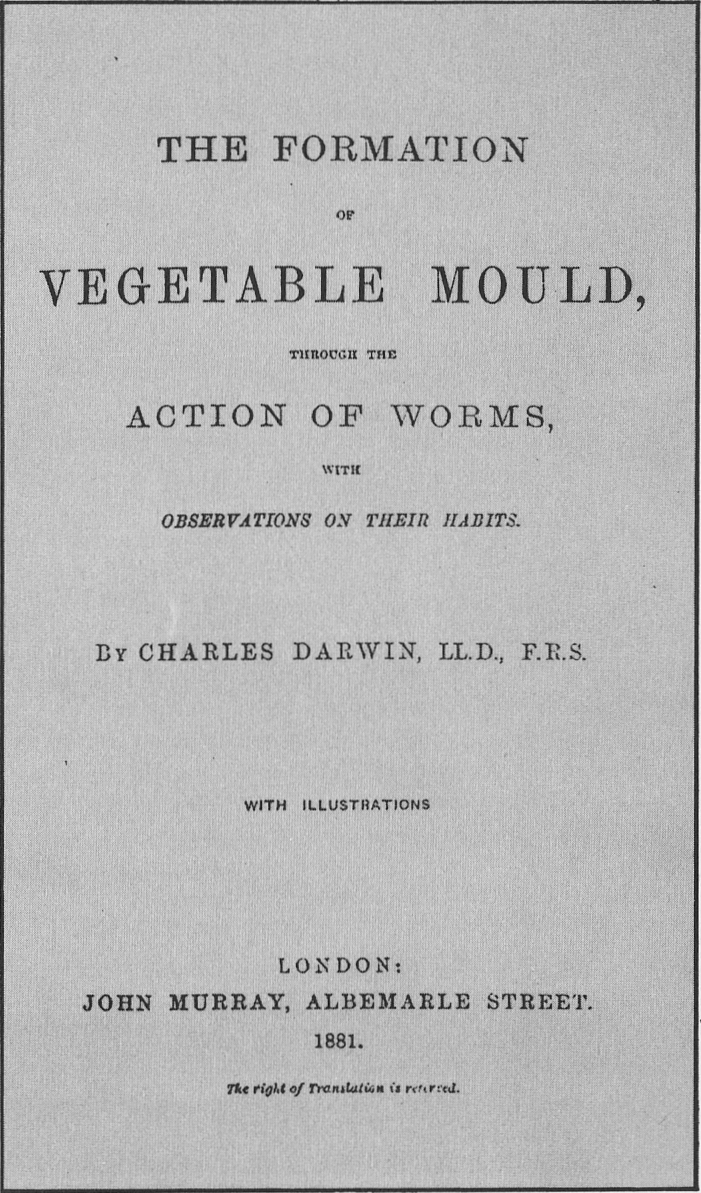
- Author: Charles Darwin
- Language: English
- Subject: Earthworms
- Publisher: John Murray
- Publication date: October 1881
- Publication place: England
- Pages: 326 (1st edition)
- Preceded by: The Power of Movement in Plants

The Formation of Vegetable Mould Through the Action of Worms, with Observations on their Habits (sometimes shortened to Worms) is an 1881 book by Charles Darwin on earthworms. It was his last scientific book, and was published shortly before his death (see Darwin from Insectivorous Plants to Worms). Exploring earthworm behaviour and ecology, it continued the theme common throughout his work that gradual changes over long periods of time can lead to large and sometimes surprising consequences. It was the first significant work on soil bioturbation, although that term was not used by Darwin (it first appeared in the soil and geomorphic literature one hundred years later).

== Paper "On the Formation of Mould" ==
After returning from the Beagle survey expedition in October 1836, Darwin was intensively occupied with further establishing his reputation as an innovative geologist, as well as finding suitable experts to describe his natural history collections and arranging for publication of their work as the multi-volume Zoology of the Voyage of H.M.S. Beagle. Near the outset of the voyage he had planned a book on geology, and during it extracts from his letters on geology had been privately published by his tutor John Stevens Henslow. Darwin now published papers on "proofs of recent elevation on the coast of Chili", "deposits containing extinct Mammalia" and "coral formations". He also rewrote his journal to incorporate observations from his notebooks as the book now called The Voyage of the Beagle, and began brain-storming in his notebooks about transmutation of species.

Darwin's health suffered from the pressure of work and on 20 September 1837, having been urged by his doctors to "knock off all work", he visited his home in Shrewsbury then went on to stay with his relatives at Maer Hall, Staffordshire, home of his uncle Josiah Wedgwood. Uncle Jos pointed out an area of ground where lime and cinders spread years previously had vanished into the soil, forming layers under a top layer of loam. Jos suggested that this might have been the work of earthworms, but apparently thought that this would be of little interest to his nephew, who was working on continental scale geological problems. Actually, Charles did find it interesting and throughout his life he sustained an interest in this "unsung creature which, in its untold millions, transformed the land as the coral polyps did the tropical sea".

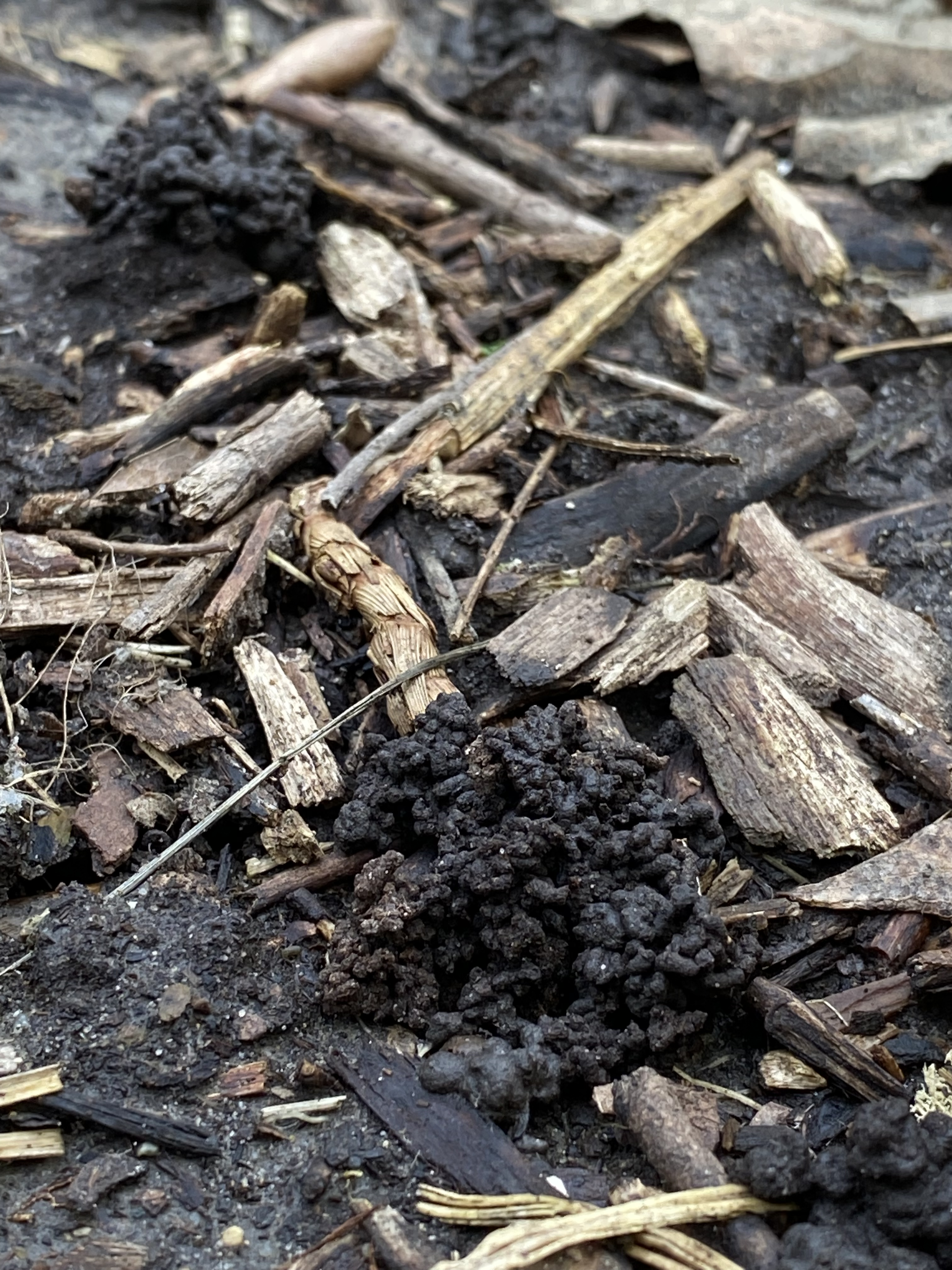
Piles of worm castings atop existing soil in a garden

He returned to London on October 21, and prepared a paper on worms forming mould. The paper on the role of earthworms in soil formation was read out by Darwin at the Geological Society of London on 1 November 1837. This was an uncommonly mundane subject for the society, and his peers may have hoped to hear of something more grandiose, even seeing this paper as highlighting Darwin's growing idiosyncrasies. The leading geologist William Buckland subsequently recommended Darwin's paper for publication, praising it as "a new & important theory to explain Phenomena of universal occurrence on the surface of the Earth—in fact a new Geological Power", while rightly rejecting Darwin's suggestion that chalkland could have been formed in a similar way.

The paper appeared in the Proceedings of the Geological Society of London in 1838, and was published with a woodcut illustration in the Transactions of the Geological Society in 1840.

== Renewed work on earthworms ==
From his brain-storming about transmutation towards the end of 1838, Darwin conceived of his theory of natural selection "by which to work", as his "prime hobby". His main work on the Beagle collections continued, and in 1842 he published the first of three volumes on geology, The Structure and Distribution of Coral Reefs. He then allowed himself to write out the first "pencil sketch" of his theory. Subsequently, in September 1842, the family moved to rural Down House where he had space for experimental plant and animal breeding, and surroundings to observe nature. In December of that year he had a quantity of broken chalk spread over a part of a long established pasture field near the house, "for the sake of observing at some future period to what depth it would become buried."

In 1872 he was having disagreements with St George Mivart about The Descent of Man. Darwin cut communication with Mivart and went the less controversial direction of the lowly worm. His network of correspondents and fans responded to his interest and "earthworm anecdotes began surfacing in his mountain of mail". He had been interested in earthworms "since his first fishing days at The Mount and flirting days at Maer". Still, other work constrained him. Broken off from Descent, he had to finish his next work The Expression of the Emotions in Man and Animals.

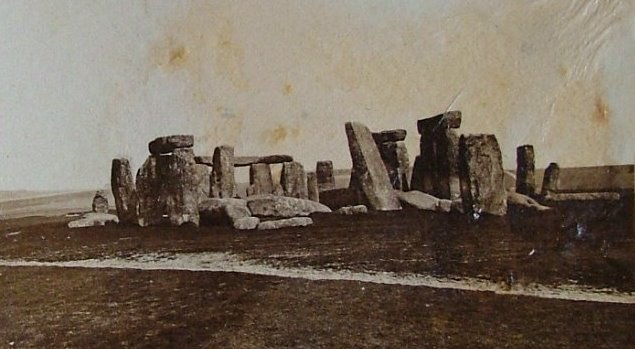
His research included a railway trip to Stonehenge

By 1876, with his first grandson on the way, he felt his writing life was nearly over, with so much unfinished. He wanted to write on earthworms "before joining them", but also had two more plant books in mind, and a revision of Fertilisation of Orchids to work on. He also began an autobiographical work intended for his family's eyes only. After turning away a request to support a controversial book on contraception (Fruits of Philosophy) – Darwin was opposed to it – he got back to work on flowers and worms. As with much of his geological and evolutionary work, worms were a case of gradual, barely noticeable changes accumulating over time into large effects. He even went on a two-hour excursion to Stonehenge to see how its monoliths had been buried by earthworm castings.

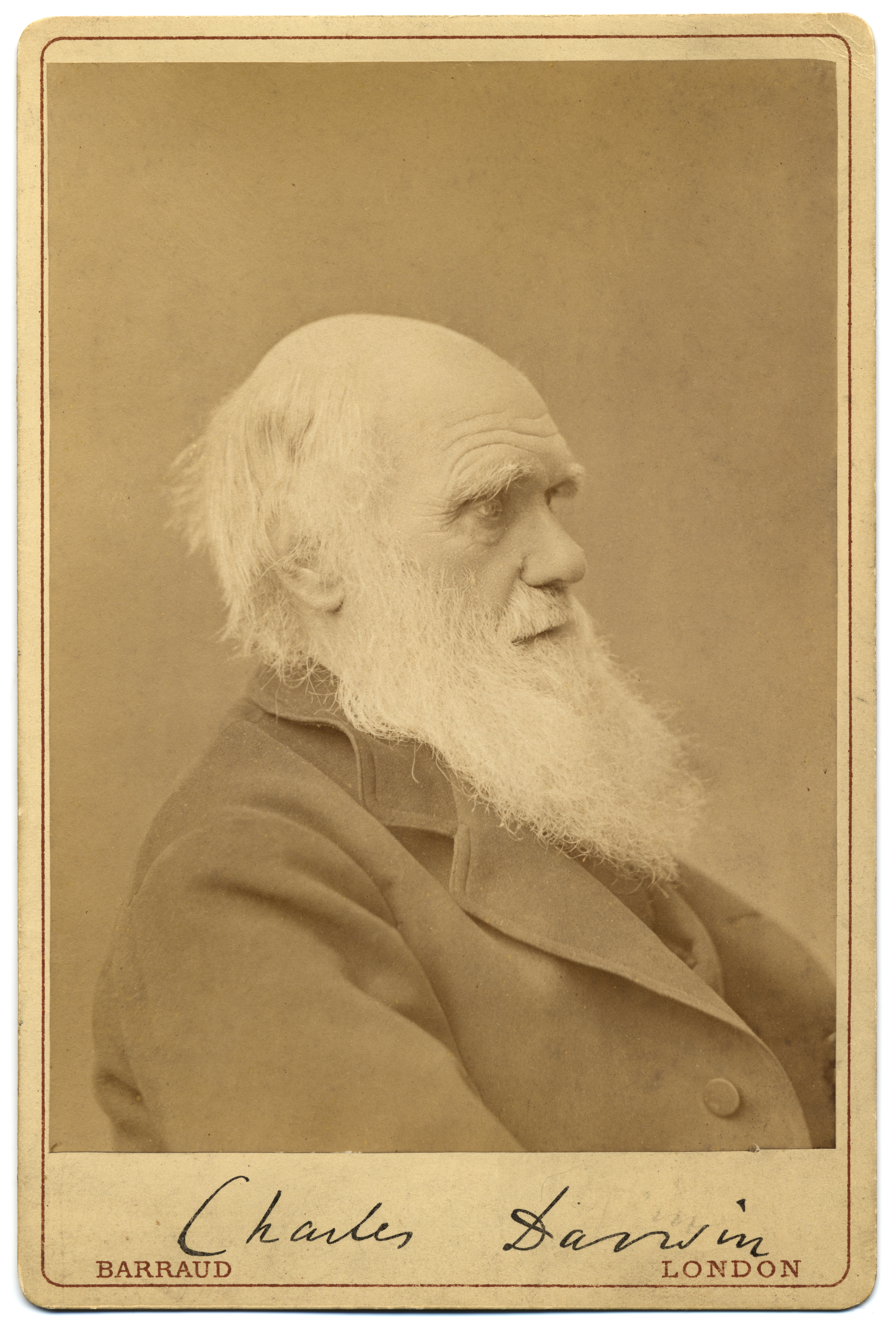
A photograph of Darwin around the time the book was published

He was occupied by worms at Downe in 1880, his work coming first. He had help from the family, even receiving soil samples from Abinger's Roman ruins. He told Vladimir Kovalevsky (his Russian translator) of slow progress with his new book.

Darwin calculated that there were 53,767 earthworms recycling away per acre. He carried out experiments indoors, where they worked the earth inside pots in a worm-littered room. He experimented with stimuli at night: strong light would send them into their burrows ("like a rabbit" said Darwin's grandson Bernard), but heat and sound had no effect. Their food preferences were also tested, raw carrots being their favourite.

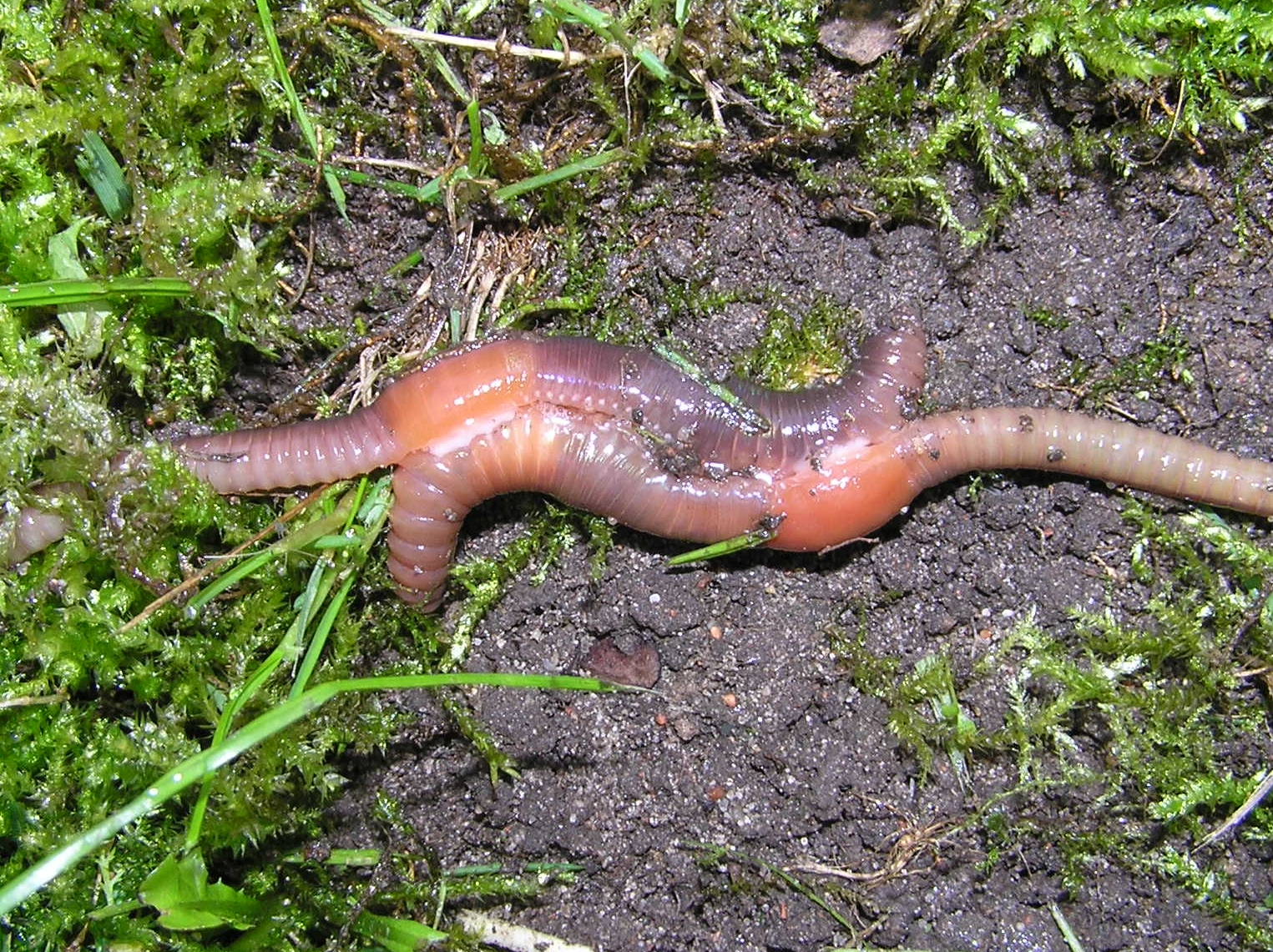
Earthworms mate in daylight, but are generally nocturnal above ground.

Darwin was fascinated by their behaviour, from enjoying "the pleasure of eating" (based on their eagerness for certain foods) to their sexual passions, "strong enough to overcome... their dread of light", even to their social feelings ("crawling over each other's bodies"). Their foraging was especially intriguing: they dragged leaves into their burrows, pulling them in the most efficient way, by their pointed end. On these semi-intelligent creatures Darwin wrote that they obtained a "notion, however rude, of the shape of an object", perhaps by feeling it out. Worms, "five or six feet" below the ground ploughed farmers fields. Darwin felt we "ought to be grateful" to these little recyclers, which he compared to "a man... born blind and deaf". He was wondering how long it would be until he would be consumed by worms himself. It would surely be his last major work; he told German translator Victor Carus "I have little strength & feel very old".

By 1881 he was unable to summon the strength for revisions and handed Worms on to Frank. His health gave him troubles; he complained to his long-time friend Hooker that he looked forward to "Down graveyard as the sweetest place on earth." Concerned about the book he had been anticipating for decades, he hurried his publisher John Murray to hasten publication of Worms even at the risk of not making a profit.

At a dinner with Edward Aveling (soon the son-in-law of Karl Marx) and other atheists, he was asked how he had turned to such an "insignificant" subject as worms, to which he replied "I have been studying their habits for forty years." As with his religious views, the old naturalist did not see things the same way as Aveling. In Darwin's view, the "insignificant" was the foundation of much greater phenomena.

== Summary ==
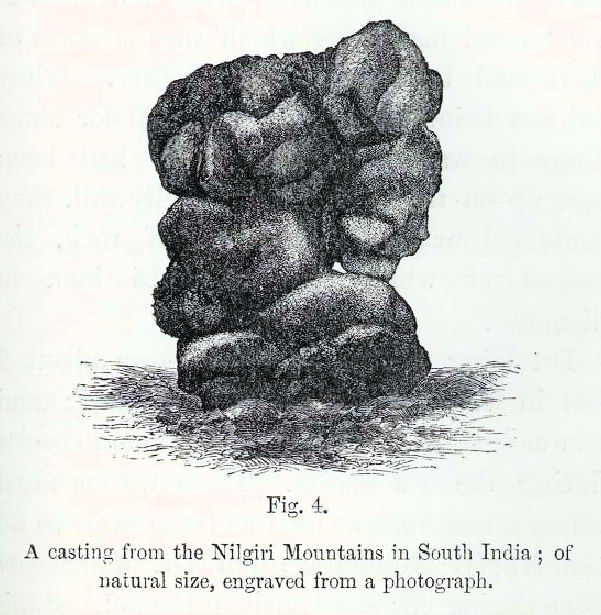
A casting from the Nilgiri Mountains in South India

Worms are found in many places, from the forest floor to mountains, and in many locations around the world. Though they are considered terrestrial animals, they are really semi-aquatic, like other annelids; they die quickly in air but survive for months in water. Though inactive during the day, they sometimes come out of their burrows at night. They are eaten by thrushes and other birds in large numbers because they lie close to the surface. They have well-developed muscular, nervous, circulatory and digestive systems, the latter being quite unique. Though eyeless, they respond to the intensity and duration of light. They also slowly respond to temperature. They have no hearing, but are sensitive to vibrations. Their sense of smell is feeble, but they are able to find their preferred foods. Omnivorous animals, they swallow much earth and extract food from it. Worms live chiefly on half decayed leaves, partially digested by a pancreatic solution before ingestion. This extra-stomachal digestion is not unlike that which Darwin had previously described as occurring in Insectivorous Plants. The structure and physiology of the calciferous glands of earthworms are described. Many hypotheses had been advanced for their function; Darwin believed them to be primarily for excretion and secondarily a digestion aid.

Thin leaves are seized with the mouth, while thick ones are dragged by creating a vacuum. Leaves and stones are used to plug up the burrow. This may deter predators, keep out water and/or keep out chilled air (the latter is Darwin's preferred function). Leaves are dragged in mostly by the tips, which is the easiest way of doing it, but when the base is narrower the worms change behaviour. They drag pine needle clusters in by the base. Petioles are used to plug up burrows, and for food. Worms drag experimental triangles of paper by the apex most of the time, and do not rely on trial and error. Worms excavate burrows by consuming material or, preferably, pushing it away. They mainly consume soil for nutrients. They are found down to six or more feet, especially in extreme conditions. Burrows are lined, which serve several functions, and terminate in a chamber lined with stones or seeds. Worms are found all over the planet, some on isolated islands; how they got there is a mystery. Darwin draws on correspondence with people from around the world such as Fritz Müller in Brazil.

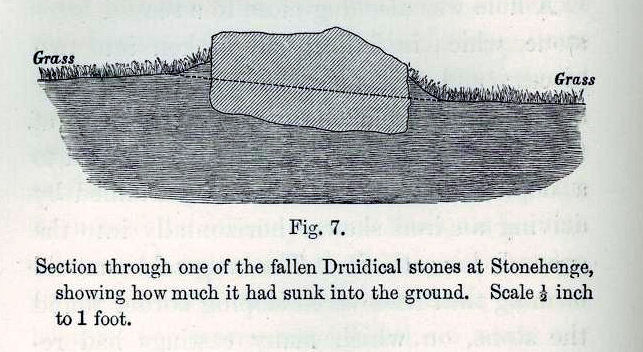
Figure from the book showing a sunken stone from Stonehenge

The amount of earth brought to the surface by worms can be estimated by the rate at which objects on the surface are buried and by weighing the earth brought up in a given time. Information from farmers on marl, cinders etc. sinking into the ground allowed Darwin to make calculations. He conducted a 29-year experiment on chalk at a field near his house. Objects of all sorts "work themselves downards" as farmers say. Large stones sink because worms fill up any hollows with castings, then eject them beyond the perimeter and the ground around them starts to rise. He visited Stonehenge and found some outer stones partly buried, the turf sloping up to meet them (see figure 7). Darwin weighed castings and had friends do so in other countries. He also weighed castings per unit area per year, then worked out how thick a layer castings would make, compared with rates of sinking. Additionally, he worked out casting weight per worm per year.

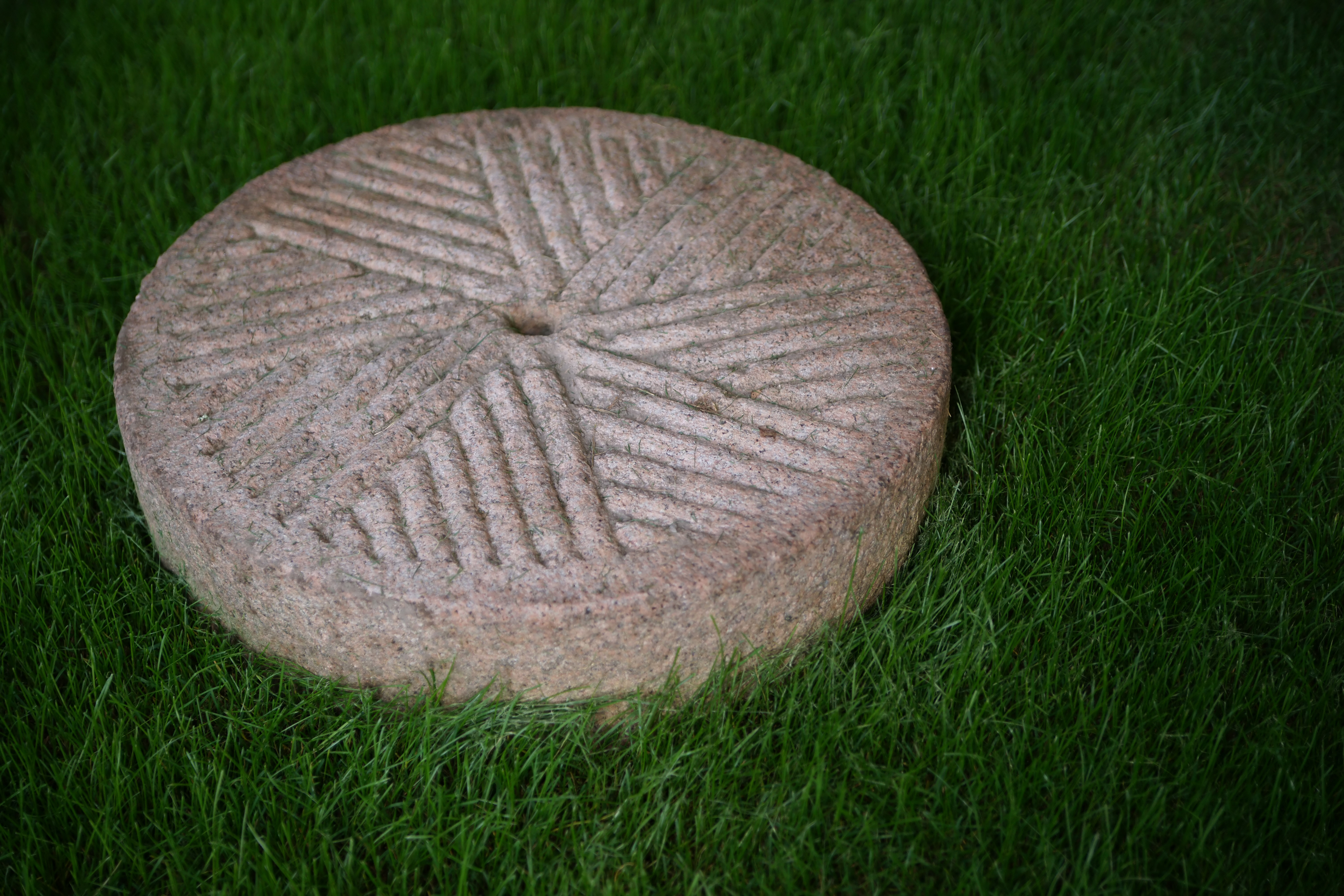
Darwin's experiments included measuring the speed with which stones slowly settle into the earth.

Worms have preserved many ancient objects under the ground. Darwin describes an ancient Roman villa in Abinger, Surrey. Worms have penetrated the concrete walls and even mortar. Similar subsidence occurred at Beaulieu Abbey, Hampshire, with worms penetrating gaps between the tiles. His sons Francis and Horace visited Chedworth Roman Villa in Gloucestershire, while William reported on Brading Roman Villa, Isle of Wight. Darwin goes into some detail on the well preserved ruins of Silchester Roman Town, Hampshire, with the help of the Rev. J. G. Joyce. Finally he discusses the case of the Viroconium Roman town ruins at Wroxeter, Shropshire, with the help of Dr. H. Johnson, who made observations including depth of vegetable mould. He concludes that both worms and other causes, such as dust deposition and washing down of soil, have buried such ruins.

Denudation (removal of matter to a lower level) is caused mainly by air and water movement. Humic acids generated by worms disintegrate rock; their burrowing behaviour speeds this up. But as the soil layer thickens, this process is slowed down. Worms swallow hard objects (e.g. stones) to aid digestion, which causes attrition to such objects. This has geological significance, especially for the smaller particles which otherwise are eroded very slowly.

Rain causes castings to move down an incline; Darwin worked out the weight moving a certain distance in a given time. Some also roll down, and collect in drains etc., or get blown. There is a greater effect on casting movement in the tropics, because of increased rain. The finest earth is washed away. Ledges on hillsides, formerly believed to be caused by grazing mammals, are partly due to casting accumulations. High winds, especially gales, are almost as effective as the slope/rain in moving castings. Crowns and furrows of formerly ploughed lands slowly vanish when under pasture, due to worms, but more slowly when there is no incline. Fine earth is washed down from slopes, making a shallow layer. Dissolving of chalk supplies new earth.

Darwin writes in the conclusion that worms "have played a more important part in the history of the world than most persons would at first suppose." They are important for many reasons, including their role in decomposition of rocks, gradual denudation of the land, preservation of archaeological remains, and improving soil conditions for plant growth. Despite their rudimentary sense organs, they show complex, flexible behaviour.

== Reception ==
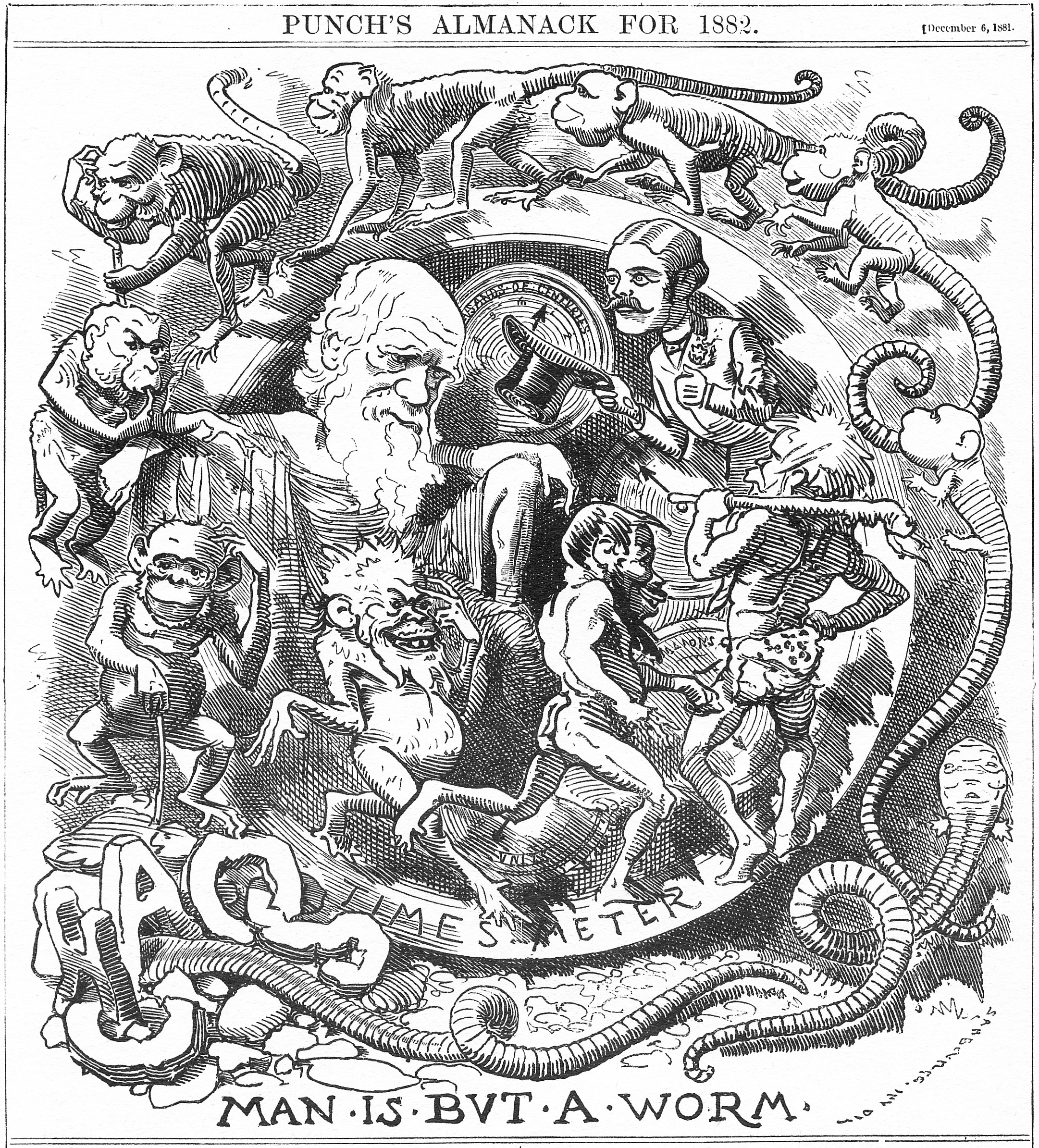
"Man is but a worm" caricature published in Punch at the end of 1881

Worms became available in October 1881 and sold thousands of copies in its first few weeks, despite Darwin's comment to Carus that it was "a small book of little moment". Darwin received a "laughable" number of letters containing questions, observations and ideas, even "idiotic" ones. A week's holiday with Emma in Cambridge was to follow. Darwin died the next year on 19 April 1882.

== See also ==
- Uniformitarianism
- Ichnology
- Burrow
- Trace fossil
