= Berkeley =

Berkeley most often refers to:

- Berkeley, California, a city in the United States
  - University of California, Berkeley, a public university in Berkeley, California
- George Berkeley (1685–1753), Anglo-Irish philosopher

Berkeley may also refer to:

== Places ==
=== Australia ===
- Berkeley, New South Wales, a suburb of Wollongong

=== Canada ===
- Berkeley, Ontario, a community in Grey County

=== United Kingdom ===
- Berkeley (hundred), an administrative division from late Saxon period to the 19th century
- Berkeley, Gloucestershire, a town in England

=== United States ===
- Berkeley, California, a city in the San Francisco Bay Area, the largest city named Berkeley
- Berkeley, Denver, a neighborhood in Denver, Colorado
- Berkeley, Illinois, a suburb of Chicago
- Berkeley, Missouri, a northwestern suburb of St. Louis
- Berkeley Township, Ocean County, New Jersey
- Berkeley, Rhode Island
- Berkeley, Virginia (disambiguation)
- Berkeley, West Virginia
- Berkeley County (disambiguation)

== People ==
- Berkeley (given name), a given name (and list of people with that name)
- Berkeley (surname), a surname (and list of people with that name)
- Berkeley family, an aristocratic English family

== Brands and enterprises ==
- Berkeley (1913), a car manufacturer in the U.K.
- Berkeley Cars, a British car manufacturer
- Berkeley Cinemas, a cinema chain in Auckland, New Zealand
- Berkeley Group Holdings, a British housebuilding company
- Berkeley Systems, a San Francisco Bay Area software company

== Hotels and public houses ==
- Berkeley Hotel, a historic former hotel in Montreal, Canada, now part of the Maison Alcan complex
- The Berkeley, a luxury hotel on Wilton Place in Knightsbridge, London, England
- The Berkeley, Scunthorpe, a pub and hotel in Lincolnshire, England
- The Berkeley, Wigan, a pub in Greater Manchester, England

== Schools ==
- University of California, Berkeley, a public research university in Berkeley, California, U.S
- Berkeley Adult School, in Berkeley, California, U.S.
- Berkeley City College, a community college in Berkeley, California, U.S.
- Berkeley College (Yale University), a residential college at Yale University, U.S.
- Berkeley College, in New York and New Jersey, U.S.
- Berklee College of Music, in Boston, Massachusetts, U.S.
- Berkeley County Schools, the operating school district within Berkeley County, West Virginia, U.S.
- Berkeley High School (disambiguation)

== Ships ==
- Berkeley (ferryboat), a ferryboat that operated on San Francisco Bay for sixty years
- HMS Berkeley Castle, two British naval ships

== Software ==
- Berkeley DB, an embedded database system by Sleepycat Software
- Berkeley Fast File System, Unix file system
- Berkeley Software Distribution, a Unix operating system

== Other uses ==
- Berkeley (film), a 2005 drama directed by Bobby Roth
- Berkeley Hundred or Berkeley Plantation, Charles City, Virginia, U.S.
- Berkeley Hunt, a foxhound pack in Gloucestershire and South Gloucestershire counties, England
- Berkeley National Laboratory, a United States national laboratory near Berkeley, California, U.S.
- Berkeley Test, saliva nitric test for assessing cardioprotection
- Berkeley Racing Canoe Center, a non-profit organization promoting dragon boat sport in the Berkeley Marina, Berkeley, CA

== See also ==
- Barkley (disambiguation)
- Berkley (disambiguation)
- Barclay (disambiguation)
- Berkeley Building
- Berkeley Group (disambiguation)
- Berkeley House (disambiguation)
- Berkeley Square (disambiguation)
- Berkeley station (disambiguation), stations of the name
- Berkelium, a transuranic element (symbol Bk) named after the University of California, Berkeley
