= Berkeley Square (disambiguation) =

Berkeley Square is a town square in the West End of London.

Berkeley Square may also refer to:

- Berkeley Square, Bristol
- Berkeley Square, Los Angeles
- Berkeley Square, Trenton, New Jersey
- Berkeley Square (play), a 1926 theatrical science fiction romance, and its film adaptations:
  - Berkeley Square (1933 film), a science fiction romance, based on the play
  - The House in the Square, a British film remake
  - Berkeley Square (1959 film), a Hallmark Hall of Fame production
- Berkeley Square (TV series), a 1998 miniseries
- Berkeley Square (club), a former music venue in Berkeley, California

== See also ==
- Berkley Square, a Las Vegas district
- Berkeley Square Historic District (disambiguation)
- Berkeley (disambiguation)
- "A Nightingale Sang in Berkeley Square", a 1939 popular song
- A Nightingale Sang in Berkeley Square (film), named after the song
