= Thomas Jones (died 1558 or 1559) =

Welsh politician (1492 – c.1558)

Thomas Jones (by 1492 – 1558/59) was a Welsh politician. He became the first Member (MP) of the Parliament of England for Pembrokeshire in 1542.

== Biography ==
=== Early life and first marriage ===
Jones came from a prominent Welsh family, counting Rhys ap Thomas among his uncles. Little is known of Jones' early life, as he first appears in record in 1513, when he participated in a military expedition to France. Following the expedition, he was appointed a Groom of the Chamber. It is known that Jones' first language was Welsh.

Jones was first married to Elizabeth Donne, daughter of Sir Edward Donne of Kidwelly, with whom he had two daughters.

=== Political career ===
In 1527, Jones received the lordship of Llandovery Castle. He was appointed to investigate his relative, Rhys ap Gruffydd, for treason in 1531, which culminated in Jones receiving Gruffydd's lands in Abermarlais. This estate became Jones' main home, but he also received Emlyn Castle. He was also appointed a Gentleman Usher in 1532.

=== Second marriage and political career ===
Jones' political career was greatly aided by his marriage to second wife Mary Perrot (née Berkeley) in 1532. The heiress of two noble English families in her own right, Mary was also the widow of Thomas Perrot of Haroldston, Pembrokeshire, a member of the landed gentry. At the time of Jones' marriage to Mary, he was around 18 years her senior. Mary brought three children of her own to the marriage, including her eldest, John Perrot. With Mary, Jones had two daughters, Eleanor and Catherine, as well as four sons: Henry, Richard, James, and John.

After Jones purchased the wardship of John Perrot from the Crown, he assumed responsibility for managing the Perrot estates near Haverfordwest. He used these holdings to launch a successful political career, beginning with a seat on Haverfordwest’s town council and eventually becoming Pembrokeshire’s first MP in 1542. Jones "came to dominate the administrative and political life of the county," and his efforts were instrumental in the creation of a parliamentary seat for Haverfordwest in 1545, restoring privileges to the district that had been removed by the Act of Union of 1536.

After John Perrot came of age, Jones not only returned the Pembrokeshire estates to his stepson, but transferred ownership of properties he had acquired during his stewardship of them. Jones and Mary then returned to Jones' Abermarlais estate. Jones was probably elected to represent Pembrokeshire again in 1553, but stood aside in favour of stepson John, whose career Jones was greatly influential in advancing.

==== Offices ====
Throughout his marriage to Mary, Jones held the following offices:

- Sheriff of Pembrokeshire (1540 – 1541; 1548 – 49)
- Member of Parliament for Pembrokeshire (1542 – 1553)
- Sheriff of Carmarthenshire (1542 – 1543)
- Sheriff of Cardiganshire (1543 – 1544)
- Member of Parliament for Pembrokeshire (elected 1558)

=== Death ===
Jones likely died in 1558 or early 1559, as probate was issued for his estate on 26 June 1559. His will included a provision for a priest at the parish church of Llansadwrn to pray for him for three years following his death.

== Personal life ==
Jones was a patron of the arts, and was especially supportive of the career of Dafydd Fynglwyd.

Though Jones was a strong Catholic, he was religiously tolerant. He maintained warm relationships with son Henry and stepson John after their conversion to Protestantism, despite the religious instability throughout England and Wales in the Tudor period.
