= Berkeley (surname) =

- Pronunciation: /ˈbɑːrkliˌˈbɜːrkli/
- Language: English

Origin
- Language: Old English
- Origin: Berkeley (habitation name)
- Derivation: beorce léah
- Meaning: 'birch lea'

Berkeley is a surname. It is also used, uncommonly, as a given name. People with the name include:

- The Berkeley family of England
  - Baron Berkeley
  - Berkeley baronets
  - Anne Berkeley, Baroness Berkeley (c.1496–1564), lady-in-waiting to Anne Boleyn, Henry VIII's second wife
  - Elizabeth Berkeley, Countess of Ormond, wife of Thomas Butler, 10th Earl of Ormond and daughter of the above
  - Lady Henrietta Berkeley (born c. 1664, died 1706)
- Anthony Berkeley Cox or Anthony Berkeley (1893–1971), writer
- Ballard Berkeley (1904–1988), English actor
- Busby Berkeley (1895–1976), film choreographer
- Edmund Berkeley (1909–1988), mathematician and computer scientist
- Elizabeth Berkeley (c1713–1799), wife of Charles Noel Somerset, 4th Duke of Beaufort
- George Berkeley (1685–1753), also known as Bishop Berkeley, Irish philosopher
- George Berkeley (died 1746) (1680–1746), MP for Dover 1720–1734
- Grantley Berkeley (1800–1881), British politician, writer
- Humphrey Berkeley (1926–1994), British politician
- John Berkeley, 1st Baron Berkeley of Stratton (1602–1678), English soldier
- John Berkeley, 3rd Baron Berkeley of Stratton (1663–1697), English admiral
- Jon Berkeley (born 1962), author and illustrator
- Sir Lennox Berkeley (1903–1989), English composer
- Mary Berkeley (born 1965), English long jumper
- Mary Berkeley (noblewoman), alleged mistress of Henry VIII and mother of his son, John Perrot
- Matthew Berkeley (born 1987), English footballer
- Michael Berkeley (born 1948), British composer and broadcaster
- Miles Joseph Berkeley (1803–1889), English cryptogramist and clergyman
- Norborne Berkeley, 4th Baron Botetourt (1718–1770), Member of Parliament and governor of Virginia Colony
- Randolph Carter Berkeley (1875–1960), United States Marine Corps major general who received the Medal of Honor for his actions during the United States occupation of Veracruz
- Reginald Cheyne Berkeley (1890–1935), British Liberal Party Member of Parliament 1922–1924, then a playwright and scriptwriter
- Sir Robert Berkeley (1584–1656), judge and MP for Worcester
- Robert G.W. Berkeley (1898–1969), landowner, high sheriff and cricketer
- Theresa Berkeley (died 1836), London dominatrix
- Sir William Berkeley (governor) (1605–1677), governor of Virginia
- Sir William Berkeley (Royal Navy officer) (1639–1666), English naval officer and admiral
- Vivian Berkeley (1941–2025), blind Canadian lawn bowling champion and 1996 paralympic silver medalist
- Xander Berkeley (born 1955), American actor

== See also ==
- Berkeley (given name)
- Berkley (disambiguation)
- Lord Berkeley (disambiguation)
- George Berkeley (disambiguation)
- Barclay
