= Berkeley Square Historic District =

Berkeley Square Historic District may refer to:

- Berkeley Square Historic District (Trenton, New Jersey), listed on the National Register of Historic Places in Mercer County, New Jersey
- Berkeley Square Historic District (Saranac Lake, New York), listed on the National Register of Historic Places in Franklin County, New York
