= Frances Reid =

American actress (1914–2010)

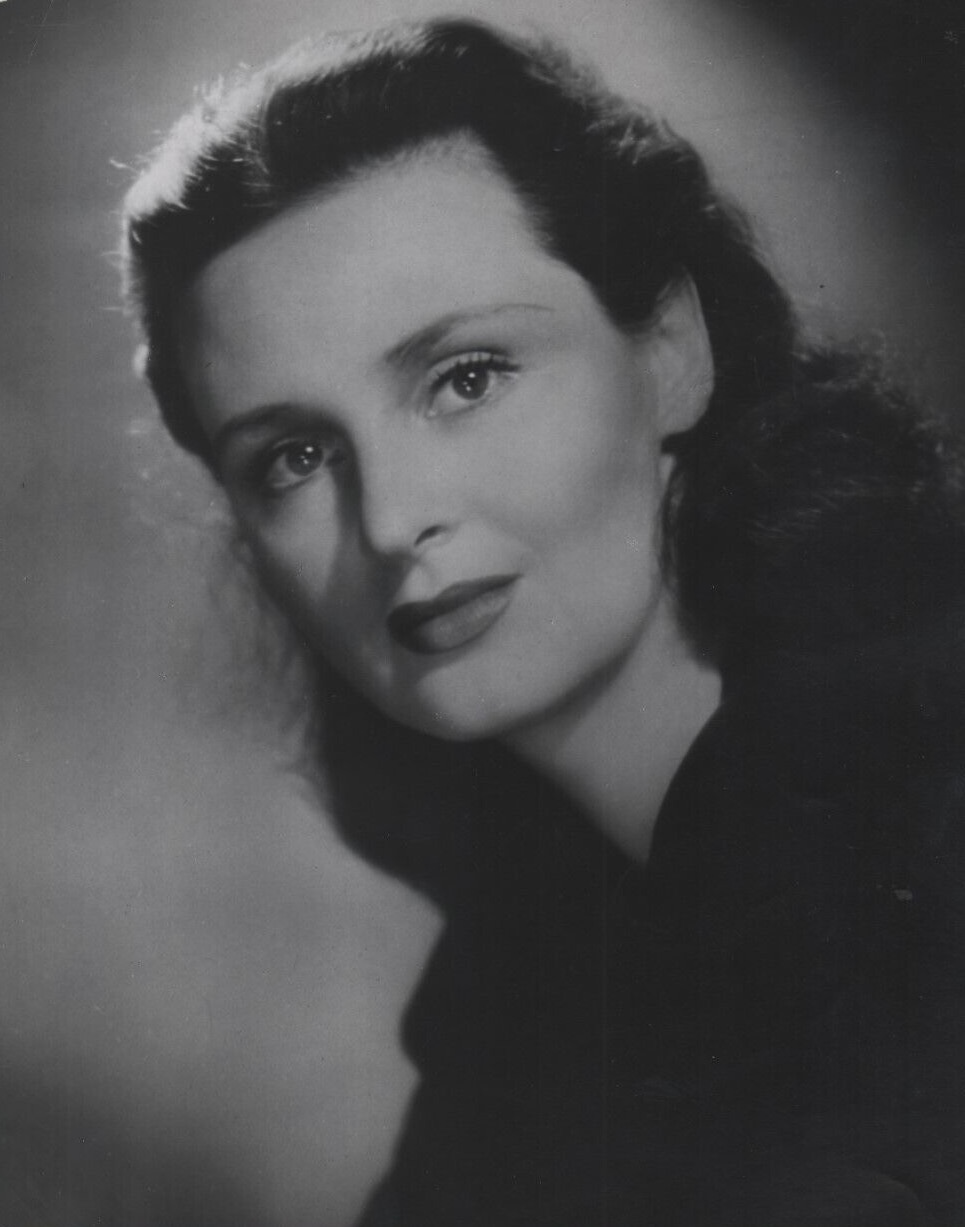
- Reid in 1949
- Born: December 9, 1914; Wichita Falls, Texas, U.S.
- Died: February 3, 2010 (aged 95); Beverly Hills, California, U.S.
- Occupation: Actress
- Years active: 1934–2007
- Spouse: Philip Bourneuf (1940–1973; divorced)

Frances Reid (December 9, 1914 – February 3, 2010) was an American dramatic actress. Reid acted on television for nearly all of the second half of the 20th century. Her career continued into the early 2000s.

Although she starred in many productions, she is best known for her portrayal of Alice Horton on the NBC daytime soap opera Days of Our Lives from its debut in November 1965 until 2007. At the time of her death, she ranked fifth on the all-time list of longest-serving soap opera actors in the United States.

== Early life and career ==
Frances Reid was born on December 9, 1914, in Wichita Falls, Texas, and raised in Beverly Hills, California. Her acting career started in 1938 with a bit part in the movie Man-Proof.

Reid's Broadway debut was as Juliette Lecourtois in Where There's a Will There's a Way at the John Golden Theatre in 1939. She later played Roxane opposite Jose Ferrer's Cyrano in the 1946 Broadway production of Cyrano de Bergerac at the Alvin Theatre, repeating the role three years later, again opposite Ferrer, in a 1949 one-hour The Philco Television Playhouse adaptation.

A member of The Actors Studio from its inception in 1947, Reid played a variety of stage roles throughout the 1940s and 1950s. From 1954 to 1955, Reid played the title role in the CBS television version of the radio serial Portia Faces Life.

She next portrayed the grasping Grace Baker, the mother-in-law of Penny Hughes, on As the World Turns from 1959 to 1962, and Rose Pollack, the kind-hearted mother of Nancy Pollock Karr, on The Edge of Night in 1964. Reid portrayed matriarch Alice Horton on NBC's Days of our Lives since the show's premiere on November 8, 1965. Reid gained mainstream attention for a 2003–2004 storyline in which Alice and several other long-running characters were seemingly murdered. Her last appearance on Days of our Lives was on December 26, 2007, although she remained on contract with the show until her death.

Reid made two guest appearances on Perry Mason starring Raymond Burr. In 1963 she played murderer Miss Givney, secretary to the guest attorney and episode's title character played by Bette Davis in "The Case of Constant Doyle." In 1965 she played defendant Lucille Forrest in "The Case of the Golden Venom."

In 1966, Reid appeared opposite Rock Hudson in the John Frankenheimer drama Seconds. In the audio commentary for the DVD version of the film, Frankenheimer called Reid one of his favourite actresses.

Reid played frontier Doctor Katy Piper on the Wagon Train episode "The Katy Piper Story", which aired on April 10, 1965.

== Personal life and death ==
Reid was married to actor Philip Bourneuf from June 27, 1940, until their divorce in 1973.

Reid died in Beverly Hills, California, at an assisted living facility, on February 3, 2010. She was 95.

== Awards ==
Nominated for a Daytime Emmy Award for Supporting Actress in 1979 and for Lead Actress in 1987, Reid was awarded a Daytime Emmy Lifetime Achievement Award in 2004. She won the Soap Opera Digest Award for Outstanding Actress in a Mature Role in 1978, 1979, 1984, and 1985, and was inducted into the Television Academy's archives in 2003.

== Filmography ==
=== Film ===
| Year | Title | Role | Notes |
|---|---|---|---|
| 1937 | Reported Missing! | Maid | Uncredited |
| 1937 | Stage Door | Bit Role | Uncredited |
| 1938 | Man-Proof | Second Girl | Uncredited |
| 1966 | Seconds | Emily Hamilton | |
| 1971 | The Andromeda Strain | Clara Dutton | |

=== Television ===
| Year | Title | Role | Notes |
|---|---|---|---|
| 1939 | A Criminal at Large | Isla Crane | TV Movie |
| 1939 | Little Women | Beth March | TV Movie |
| 1949 | Actor's Studio | | Season 1 Episode 27: "Three O'Clock" |
| 1949 | NBC Repertory Theatre | | Episode: "Bedelia" |
| 1949 | Lights Out | | Season 2 Episode 1: "Edna Warren" |
| 1949–1951 | The Philco Television Playhouse | (1) Roxane | (1) Season 1 Episode 15: "Cyrano de Bergerac" (1949) (2) Season 1 Episode 41: "The Fourth Wall" (1949) (3) Season 2 Episode 12: "Medical Meeting" (1949) (4) Season 3 Episode 19: "The Lost Diplomat" (1951) |
| 1950 | The Ford Theatre Hour | Babbie | Season 2 Episode 14: "The Little Minister" |
| 1950 | The Chevrolet Tele-Theatre | | Season 2 Episode 33: "Introduction" |
| 1950 | Hands of Murder | | Season 2 Episode 17: "Transfer in Death" |
| 1951–1963 | Armstrong Circle Theatre | Mrs. Richel / Eve Banner | 4 episodes |
| 1952 | Hallmark Hall of Fame | | Season 1 Episode 37: "Horns of a Dilemma" |
| 1952 | The Secret Vote | | TV Movie |
| 1953 | Crown of Audubon | | TV Movie |
| 1953 | Photography by Brady | | TV Movie |
| 1953 | Suspense | | Season 5 Episode 24: "Death in the Cave" |
| 1953 | Danger | | Season 4 Episode 13: "Prelude to Death" |
| 1953–1954 | You Are There | (1) Lucie Dreyfus (2) Mrs. Mary O'Connell | (1) Season 1 Episode 18: "The Dreyfus Case" (2) Season 2 Episode 14: "The Gettysburg Address" (3) Season 2 Episode 41: "The Fall of Parnell (December 6, 1890)" |
| 1954 | The Man Behind the Badge | | Season 1 Episode 17: "The Los Angeles Story" |
| 1954 | Kraft Television Theatre | | Season 7 Episode 27: "Two Weeks in the Country" |
| 1954 | The Big Story | | Season 5 Episode 28: "Miss Edna Wright of the Chicago Daily News" |
| 1954–1955 | Portia Faces Life | Portia Manning | 3 episodes |
| 1955 | The Brighter Day | Portia Manning | Episode dated 21 March 1955 |
| 1955 | Windows | | Episode: "The Outing" |
| 1955–1956 | Matinee Theater | (1) Jane Kelsey | (1) Season 1 Episode 1: "Beginning Now" (1955) (2) Season 1 Episode 14: "The Aspern Papers" (1955) (3) Season 1 Episode 33: "The Sins of the Fathers" (1955) (4) Season 1 Episode 42: "Horns of Dilemma" (1955) (5) Season 1 Episode 75: "Valentine's Day" (1956) (6) Season 1 Episode 164: "The Guest Cottage" (1956) (7) Season 1 Episode 179: "Marriage by the Millions" (1956) |
| 1956 | Telephone Time | Matilda Bergh | Season 1 Episode 10: "Harry in Search of Himself" |
| 1956 | The Wrong Man | Mrs. O'Connor | Voice, uncredited |
| 1957 | Studio One | Gertrude | Season 9 Episode 24: "A Member of the Family" |
| 1957 | Lux Video Theatre | Dr. McDavid | Season 7 Episode 44: "Dark Hammock" |
| 1959 | Berkeley Square | Duchess of Devonshire | TV Movie |
| 1959–1962 | As the World Turns | Grace Baker #2 | |
| 1960 | The Fisher Family | Mrs. Taylor | Episode: "Homecoming" |
| 1961 | Alfred Hitchcock Presents | Mrs. Mary Peters | Season 7 Episode 12: "A Jury of Her Peers" |
| 1962 | General Electric Theater | Vera Parsons | Season 10 Episode 33: "Somebody Please Help Me!" |
| 1962–1965 | Wagon Train | (1) Margaret Clay (2) Mary Carter (3) Florence Hastings (4) Mrs. Lawton (5) Dr. Katy Piper | (1) Season 5 Episode 21: "The Daniel Clay Story" (1962) (2) Season 5 Episode 34: "The Frank Carter Story" (1962) (3) Season 6 Episode 11: "The Kurt Davos Story" (1962) (4) Season 6 Episode 24: "The Emmett Lawton Story" (1963) (5) Season 8 Episode 23: "The Katy Piper Story" (1965) |
| 1963 | Ben Casey | Miss Fogarty | Season 2 Episode 26: "Father Was an Intern" |
| 1963 | The Defenders | Mary Cheyney | Season 2 Episode 29: "The Colossus" |
| 1963 | The Eleventh Hour | Louise Forman | Season 1 Episode 27: "Try to Keep Alive Until Next Tuesday" |
| 1963–1965 | Perry Mason | (1) Miss Liza Givney (2) Lucille Forrest | (1) Season 6, Episode 16: "The Case of the Constant Doyle" (2) Season 8 Episode 16: "The Case of the Golden Venom" |
| 1964 | The Edge of Night | Rose Pollock #2 | |
| 1964 | Channing | Isabel Franklin | Season 1 Episode 22: "The Trouble with Girls" |
| 1965 | The Alfred Hitchcock Hour | Joyce's Mother | Season 3 Episode 16: "One of the Family" |
| 1965 | Mr. Novak | Elsie Wheeler | Season 2 Episode 20: "The Silent Dissuaders" |
| 1965 | Dr. Kildare | Emmy Foray | 2 episodes |
| 1965–2007 | Days of Our Lives | Alice Horton | Series regular 3386 episodes |
| 1968 | The F.B.I. | (1) Ellen Porter (2) Mrs. Prior | (1) Season 3 Episode 16: "Crisis Ground" (2) Season 4 Episode 5: "Death of a Fixer" |
| 1973 | The Magician | Eleanor Gilpin | Season 1 Episode 4: "Lightning on a Dry Day" |
| 1973 | The Affair | Mrs. Patterson | TV Movie |
| 1975 | S.W.A.T. | Mrs. Dennis | Season 1 Episode 6: "Jungle War" |
| 1975 | Matt Helm | Millie | Season 1 Episode 3: "Scavenger's Paradise" |
| 1978 | Project U.F.O. | Martha Carlyle | Season 1 Episode 1: "Sighting 4001: The Washington D.C. Incident" |
| 1987 | Mercy or Murder? | Emily Gilbert | TV Movie |
| 1992 | One Stormy Night | Alice Grayson Horton | TV Movie |
| 2000 | Days of Our Lives' 35th Anniversary | Alice Grayson Horton | TV Movie |
| 2004 | American Dreams | Lady in Pryor TV & Radio | Season 2 Episode 14: "Old Enough to Fight" |

== Awards and nominations ==
| Year | Award | Category | Nominated work | Result |
|---|---|---|---|---|
| 1978 | Soapy Awards | Favorite Actress in a Mature Role | Days of Our Lives | Won |
| 1979 | Soapy Awards | Favorite Actress in a Mature Role | Days of Our Lives | Won |
| 1979 | 6th Daytime Emmy Awards | Daytime Emmy Award for Outstanding Supporting Actress in a Drama Series | Days of Our Lives | Nominated |
| 1984 | Soap Opera Digest Awards | Outstanding Actress in a Mature Roles in a Daytime Soap Opera | Days of Our Lives | Won |
| 1985 | Soap Opera Digest Awards | Outstanding Actress in a Mature Role in a Daytime Serial | Days of Our Lives | Won |
| 1987 | 14th Daytime Emmy Awards | Daytime Emmy Award for Outstanding Lead Actress in a Drama Series | Days of Our Lives | Nominated |
| 1990 | Soap Opera Digest Awards | Editor's Choice | | Won |
| 2004 | 31st Daytime Emmy Awards | Lifetime Achievement Award | | Won |

== See also ==
- List of longest-serving soap opera actors
