= Beyond a Reasonable Doubt (1956 film) =

1956 American film directed by Fritz Lang

- Theatrical film poster
- Directed by: Fritz Lang
- Screenplay by: Douglas Morrow
- Story by: Douglas Morrow
- Produced by: Bert E. Friedlob
- Starring: Dana Andrews; Joan Fontaine
- Cinematography: William Snyder
- Edited by: Gene Fowler Jr.
- Music by: Herschel Burke Gilbert
- Production company: Bert E. Friedlob Productions
- Distributed by: RKO Radio Pictures
- Release date: September 13, 1956
- Running time: 80 minutes
- Country: United States
- Language: English
- Box office: $1.1 million (US rentals)

Beyond a Reasonable Doubt is a 1956 American film noir legal drama directed by Fritz Lang and written by Douglas Morrow. The film stars Dana Andrews and Joan Fontaine, with Sidney Blackmer, Philip Bourneuf, Shepperd Strudwick and Arthur Franz in supporting roles. It was Lang's second film for producer Bert E. Friedlob and the last American film that he directed.

== Plot ==
Austin Spencer, a wealthy newspaper publisher who opposes the death penalty, wants to prove that innocent men could be convicted and executed based on circumstantial evidence. He convinces his daughter Susan's fiancé, successful novelist and former employee Tom Garrett, to participate in a hoax in an attempt to expose the city's overzealous district attorney Roy Thompson and strike a blow against capital punishment. Spencer's plan is for Tom to plant clues that will lead to his arrest for the recent murder of a female nightclub dancer, Patty Gray. Once Tom is found guilty, Spencer is to publicly reveal the setup to free Tom and thereby deliver his political message.

Tom agrees to cooperate and researches Patty's murder by romancing one of Patty's former fellow dancers. He is arrested while appearing to be attacking her and is convicted and sentenced to death for Patty's murder when the physical evidence that he and Spencer had intentionally planted is discovered. However, while en route to present exonerating evidence and end the hoax, Spencer is killed in a car accident. Staged photographs and a paper trail of receipts for purchases of clothes and incidentals used in the setup are burned beyond recognition in the fiery wreck.

Now with no one to free him, Tom is on death row and desperately endeavors to convince the district attorney that the evidence was planted as part of a hoax. Susan, now in command of the newspaper, prints an editorial blasting the district attorney and supporting Tom's story. The publicity that the editorial receives prompts the trial judge to consider reopening the case, but he ultimately refuses.

Several hours before Tom's scheduled execution, a handwritten statement left by Spencer to be read in case of his death is discovered. With the confirmation of Tom's story, Thompson admits that he was wrong and frees Tom. The state's governor announces a press conference at which he will sign a pardon. Shortly before the press conference, Tom speaks with Susan and inadvertently mentions the murder victim's real name of Emma, which had never been disclosed during the trial. Susan now knows that Tom is indeed a murderer. He confesses that the victim was actually his estranged wife who had tricked him into marriage many years ago and had reneged on her promise to divorce him. The success of his first novel had caused Emma to reappear, seeking to claim a share of his newfound prosperity and preventing him from marrying Susan. Tom had seized upon Spencer's hoax idea as the perfect cover for his murder of Emma.

Susan is torn between remaining silent to protect Tom and divulging what she has learned. She attempts to phone the prison to reveal the truth but cannot allow herself to follow through with the call. At the press conference, a phone call for the governor is received just as he is about to sign Tom's pardon. Upon hearing Susan's revelation, he cancels the pardon and Tom is led away and is presumably executed later that night.

== Cast ==
- Dana Andrews as Tom Garrett
- Joan Fontaine as Susan Spencer
- Sidney Blackmer as Austin Spencer
- Shepperd Strudwick as Jonathan Wilson
- Arthur Franz as Bob Hale
- Philip Bourneuf as DA Roy Thompson
- Edward Binns as Lt. Kennedy
- Robin Raymond as Terry Larue
- Barbara Nichols as Dolly Moore
- Dan Seymour as Greco
- Rusty Lane as Judge
- Joyce Taylor as Joan Williams
- Carleton Young as Allan Kirk
- Joe Kirk as Clothing Store Clerk
- Wendell Niles as Announcer
- Charles Evans as Governor

== Themes and analysis ==
Fritz Lang's two final Hollywood films, While the City Sleeps and Beyond a Reasonable Doubt, share a number of overlapping themes and even a plot element, as noted by Darragh O'Donoghue: a journalist and novelist played by Dana Andrews effectively volunteers for the electric chair: "both films could be thought of as stories about adult boys and their malicious games... Garrett sets out to expose the dangers of a legal system that culminates in capital punishment by planting evidence to get himself wrongly convicted of murder. Lang sets out to expose the simplistic assumptions of a social and cultural system that encourages us to follow this scheme so readily."

Joshua Polanksi suggests that the film is less about the American legal system but the more philosophical problem implied by the film title: "a discursive antagonism of the knowability of truth. Even the presentation of the facts appears straightforward and deliberately omits the usual "strong cinematic indicators" of guilt. Robert K. Knight goes further: the film's twist ending is dependent on Lang's "adherence to other conventions" such as the audience's "conventional response to the male lead and ostensibly virtuous hero", Andrews having previously played an everyman victim-hero in The Best Years of Our Lives as well as victims of miscarriages of justice in The Ox-Bow Incident and The Purple Heart. O'Donoghue similarly points out that the film relies on "popular faith in recording technology and professional masculinity," such that the criminal "succeeds in eliminating that gap between his fiction and the 'real world' of the viewer by overlaying one reality with another by seeming sleight of hand. Everything we see ... is the absolute truth, but we are led to read the evidence erroneously. It is what we don't see that changes everything—previously harmless conventions of film grammar, such as the overfamiliar dissolve transitioning between scenes, are shown to conceal literally unspeakable acts."

== Production ==
Screenwriter Douglas Morrow was also a law student at Columbia University. He had intended to found an independent production company and develop his story idea into a screenplay with Ida Lupino, with Joseph Cotten in mind to star in the role of Tom Garrett. When that plan fell through, independent producer Bert Friedlob bought the rights to Morrow's story and Lupino and Cotten were eventually dropped from the project, Friedlob also working with Fritz Lang on While the City Sleeps. The two had a "contentious relationship," arguing over the film's ending; Lang got the ending he wanted, though he was personally unsatisfied with the film.

Working on a low budget, Lang and screenwriter Morrow pared down the usual trappings of film noir: no rain-slicked streets, no femme fatale, no expressionist shadows. "What remains is a film about the machinery of proof – how evidence is constructed, how guilt is assigned, how the justice system can be manipulated by those who understand its logic." The film was shot in 20 or 21 days.

== Release ==
Beyond a Reasonable Doubt had a limited release, premiering on September 13, 1956.

It was released on DVD by Warner Home Video on May 16, 2011. The Warners Archive Collection series blu-ray was released on March 13, 2018.

== Reception ==
On the review aggregator website Rotten Tomatoes, the film has a rating of 70% based on 20 reviews.

=== Contemporary ===
Critics writing shortly after the film's release often dismissed it as a minor work. Some found its plot unrealistic from a legal standpoint. In a review for The New York Times, Bosley Crowther wrote: "a couple of eminent gentlemen conspiring to 'frame' false evidence that would make it appear one of them has murdered a nightclub dame. ... highly dubious as a practical exposition... conspiring to subvert justice and fool the courts." Crowther listed other issues such the portrayal of the governor's pardon: "if you can swallow such arrant disregard for the law, you may find this a fairly intriguing and brainteasing mystery film." Similarly, The Boston Globe's John William Riley noted that "any newspaper reporter would know that a man who deliberately faked evidence, no matter what his purpose, would put himself in jeopardy before the court. The simple, legal aspects ... do not stand up as well as its rather complicated fiction." John L. Scott of the Los Angeles Times also lamented the film's plot, suggesting that the film probably read very well but lost something "in its transfer to the screen. Most of the players seem to have adopted an almost indifferent attitude in their performance."

Lang himself was quoted as saying of the film: "I hate it, but it was a great success. I don't know why."

=== Retrospective ===
Writing for the Radio Times, David Parkinson assigned the film 4 stars and considered the film an appropriate swan song for Fritz Lang's Hollywood career: "While perhaps overdependent on coincidence and contrivance, this deft thriller guards its secret right to the end." Dave Kehr remarked how the film is "shot in a stripped-down, almost anonymous style that seems to befit its bitterness and disillusion", calling the film's conclusion "shatteringly nihilistic." Tom Milne compared the characters to pawns "arbitrarily shifted in demonstration of a fascinating theorem... the film is not concerned with innocence or guilt but with demonstrating that justice, finally, lies in the hand of fate. Not a forthcoming film, but one which repays attention." Derek Malcolm considered the performance given by Dana Andrews to be one of his most effective, and illustrative of Lang's greatness as a director. "It is a film of great economy and precision (it lasts only 80 minutes), with the terrifying inevitability of Greek tragedy and a pervading sense that man is his own worst enemy." Malcolm goes on to say: "This story is so tautly directed and skillful in its manipulation of our sympathies that, several times during the film, one changes sides... Lang makes a simple format beautifully complicated. The form is one thing, the content another in most movies. Here they are indivisible." Dennis Schwartz of the Online Film Critics Society considered the story "carelessly written" but "ably directed": a "subversive film" with a "perverse atmosphere of subliminal uncertainty" that "prevails over the established surface reality... The stark, alluring and unconventional film is worth seeing for the ingenuous way it resolves the brain-teasing dilemma it raised."

== Legacy ==
Darragh O'Donoghue notes that Beyond a Reasonable Doubt inspired many modern directors, particularly among Catholic-born filmmakers: Alfred Hitchcock adapted the "unfashionably stripped-down style" for The Wrong Man (1957), and then "supercharged" the "suppressive" narrative in Vertigo (1958). Hitchcock’s followers and future filmmakers in the Cahiers du cinéma group, François Truffaut discussing it in an important 1958 essay on Lang's American work; Jacques Rivette's contemporary review is "a cornerstone of film studies." O'Donoghue goes on to cite Eric Rohmer, Claude Chabrol, Jean-Luc Godard among the group, and finally Krzysztof Kieślowski's A Short Film About Killing (1988).

== Remake ==
A remake was in the works at Universal circa 1998 for producer Gary Lucchesi, as part of a planned series of RKO remakes made in cooperation with various studios. That version did not happen, but a remake remained under consideration at RKO by mid-2002. The project resurfaced in April 2004 when New Regency announced it had bought a spec script from David Collard for a remake at Fox. In June 2005, Franc Reyes was publicly attached to rewrite and direct the film, scheduled to begin shooting in September of that year, but his version did not materialize either.

The remake was re-announced in February 2008 at Berlin's European Film Market, with Peter Hyams directing and Michael Douglas headlining the cast. This time, RKO partnered with Mark Damon's Foresight Unlimited, Moshe Diamant's Signature Pictures and Courtney Solomon's Autonomous Pictures, a company spun off his After Dark Films to produce less genre-oriented fare.

The remake's American release was delayed, premiering in Spain instead. On Rotten Tomatoes the film has an approval rating of 7% based on 28 reviews, with an average rating of 3.3/10. The website's critical consensus reads, "Hackneyed and over dramatic, this undercooked courtroom drama suffers from bad dialogue and a twist ending you'll see from a distance." Metacritic, which uses a weighted average, assigned the film a score of 35 out of 100, based on 11 critics, indicating "generally unfavorable" reviews.

== See also ==
- The Man Who Dared (1946)
- The Life of David Gale (2003)
- List of American films of 1956
