= Berkeley House =

Berkeley House may refer to:

- Berkeley House, London, a classical mansion in London that was destroyed by fire in 1733 and replaced by Devonshire House
- Berkeley House, York, Upper Canada, a large home occupied by two Clerks of the Executive Council
- Berkeley House is an alternate name for the Whitehall Museum House, in Rhode Island, which is on the USA's National Register of Historic Places

== See also ==
- Berkeley (disambiguation)
