= Windows (TV series) =

American TV dramatic anthology series (1955)

Windows is a live 30-minute American dramatic anthology television series that was broadcast from July 8, 1955, to August 26, 1955. Eight episodes aired from New York City on CBS in 1955 as a summer replacement for Edward R. Murrow's Person to Person series. Notable guest stars included Geraldine Page, Jason Robards, Melvyn Douglas, and Anthony Perkins.

Each episode of the show began by showing a window, after which the cameral moved through the window to begin the telling of the story, with each story "designed to show real people confronting real problems".

Windows was created by Frank DeFelitta and Mort Abrahams and produced by Abrahams. Its directors were Jack Garfein, Jose Quintero, John Stix, and Leonard Valenta. Its writers included Shirley Peterson, Ray Bradbury and Arnold Schulman. The show was broadcast from 10:30 to 11 p.m. Eastern Time on Fridays. Amoco and Hamm Brewing Company sponsored the program, which originated from WCBS-TV.

== Episodes ==
- July 8, 1955 - "The Outing" - Kent Smith, Frances Reid, Michael Allen, Philip Coolidge, Charles Mendick, Charles Taylor, Pud Flanagan, Susan Reilly
- July 15, 1955 - "Sub-Let" - Gusti Huber, John Baragrey, Catherine McLeod
- July 22, 1955 - "The World Out there" - Mary Perry, Anthony Perkins, Joseph Sweeney, Doro Merande
- August 5, 1955 - "A Domestic Dilemma" - starring Page, Robards, and Ralph Nelson Jr.

== Critical response ==
A review in The New York Times called Windows "One of the more refreshing oases among the dreary wastes of summer television". The review of the August 5, 1955, episode commended Page's use of expression and inflection to create tensions that did not exist in the script. The "relaxed direction" also earned compliments for use of the camera "to bring out as much as it can from what it sees" and for "above all, a willingness to let silence reign when there is nothing to say."

The trade publication Variety described "The Outing" (an episode about children) as "juvenile in more ways that one" with "an implausible script and unbelievable portrayals." It added that the cast apparently found the script unbelievable, also.
