= The Palace of Laughter =

2006 novel by Jon Berkeley

- Author: Jon Berkeley
- Cover artist: Brandon Dorman (illustrator)
- Language: English
- Series: Wednesday Tales (Book 1)
- Genre: Fantasy novel
- Publisher: Julie Andrew Collection-Imprint of HarperCollins Publisher
- Publication date: 2006
- Publication place: USA
- Media type: Print (hardback & paperback)
- Pages: 464 pp (Paperback edition)
- ISBN: 978-0-06-075509-6 (USA paperback edition)
- OCLC: 144226745
- Preceded by: NA
- Followed by: The Tiger's Egg and The Lightning Key

The Palace of Laughter, The Wednesday Tales #1 is a novel by Jon Berkeley, published in 2006. It tells the tale of an orphan named Miles Wednesday.

== Plot ==
Miles Wednesday, an orphan boy who has recently escaped from the cruel Pinchbucket's orphanage, is the only one who witnesses the arrival of the Circus Oscuro in town one night. He is promptly visited by a tiger with the ability to talk; he considers making Miles his next meal, but leaves him alone after he "smells the circus in him". Miles, who has never even been to a circus before in his life, wonders what he could mean.

The next evening, Miles sneaks into the circus to find the tiger and watches some of the show from behind the bleachers. He sees a small girl performing acrobatic stunts fall from the top of the tent and tries to catch her. She sprouts wings, however, and flies to safety. Miles' act of bravery results in him being kicked out by the ringmaster's right-hand man, Ghengis. Miles stays hidden and sees the acrobat, who calls herself "Little", being tied up and taken back to her wagon when the show ends. Miles introduces himself and tries to steal the keys to rescue her, but is caught by the ringmaster, the Great Cortado. Miles pretends that he is interested in joining the circus and steps outside to prepare a "disappearing act". Angered at being tricked and losing one of his stars, Cortado unleashes a monstrous beast called The Null to chase after Little and Miles. The two children barely escape.

Miles takes Little to a friend of his, a widow called Lady Partridge, who lives with her many cats in a treehouse made of her own antiques. Partridge gives them shelter and Little tells her story—she is actually a 400-year-old Song Angel who fell from the sky along with her friend Silverpoint, a Storm Angel. After seeing Silverpoint protect Little from a mean clown by shooting lightning bolts at him, the Great Cortado kidnaps and separates the two; he takes Silverpoint to a mysterious place called the Palace of Laughter and forces him to perform there to protect Little. To prove her ability, Little sings Miles' stuffed bear, Tangerine, to life. Miles and Little decide to find the Palace of Laughter and rescue Silverpoint.

The two meet many difficulties along the way. Tangerine wanders away from Miles and is taken by Ghengis, leaving Miles heartbroken. Luckily, the tiger appears again, and carries Miles and Little for a good portion of the journey. The tiger, after much pestering from Miles, reveals that the Circus Oscuro did have a tiger once: the tiger, Varippuli, was originally part of the circus of a great man called Barty Fumble, and showed him more loyalty than could ever be fathomed. The circus was always a success, until the year the Circus Oscuro appeared and began stealing the crowds. Barty was expecting his first child and knew he could not afford failure. He made a deal with the Great Cortado to combine the two circuses for the summer and then part ways. All was well until Barty's wife died in labour, leaving him heartbroken. He disappeared with his son, leaving Varippuli to the wrath of the evil Cortado. After attempting to starve Varippuli to make him perform once more, Cortado tried to whip the beast, but it got the better of him. Before Varippuli could deliver the final blow, Cortado found his gun and supposedly killed the tiger.

Miles also runs into an old friend of Lady Partridge, an elderly former explorer named Baltinglass of Araby, who eagerly aids them. Just before they can reach the Palace of Laughter, Miles and Little are taken by a violent gang of orphan boys called the Halfheads and caught between the constant rivalry of two other gangs, the Stinkers and Gnats. With the help of Henry, one friendly member of the Halfheads and after the betrayal of String (who holds a grudge against Miles after being replaced by him), Little and Miles reach the Palace of Laughter and find it is nowhere near the pleasant place they expected it to be. The Great Cortado uses a method he has devised with the mysterious Dr. Tau-Tau to make people laugh uncontrollably and steal the laughter and happiness out of their souls. He then sells a drink that can temporarily make them feel themselves again. Cortado plans to spread his influence across the towns and eventually the world.

Miles and Little are caught by Silverpoint, who at first pretends to not recognise them to keep them safe. He finally reveals Cortado's plan, and the three are befriended by the clown trio, the Bosillio brothers, who wish to help them. Cortado intends to make Miles and Little sit through the next performance and share the same fate as the other unfortunate spectators, but Miles is able to steal some of the antidote given to the clowns, Cortado, and Genghis before the show. Cortado and Genghis happen to drink the water Miles replaces it with and now cannot stop laughing senselessly. The police arrive, informed by Lady Partridge and Baltinglass, who were informed by Partridge's cats who in turn were tipped off by the tiger. They lock up Genghis and Cortado in the local asylum since they can't answer to any accusations after falling victim to their own scheme.

String plans to get revenge on Miles by stealing Little and using her ability to fly to make himself the leader of the Stinkers. He finds a room where he believes she is locked up, but instead unleashes the Null. The monster goes on a rampage and Silverpoint is knocked unconscious trying to defeat him. He is about to squeeze Miles to death when Little sings her true name, saving Miles but tying herself to the earth forever. She loses her wings and is rescued from falling by the Bosillio Brothers. The Null is now much more tame and surprisingly affectionate towards Miles, who finds that he cannot let the city council destroy it. The Bosillio Brothers find Tangerine and return him to Miles, revealing that they gave it to him the day he was born. Barty Fumble was Miles' father and they were a part of his circus. Silverpoint returns the Realm of the Angels but is forced to leave Little behind. After one more talk with the enigmatic tiger (who Miles suspects is Varippuli), he promises to find what happened to his father and make Little's life on earth as happy as it was in the heavens.

== Characters ==
- Miles Wednesday – A boy whose last name comes from the Pinchbuckets, the nasty owners of the orphanage who name their charges after the day they were dropped off. Miles learns the meaning of friendship and courage he never had during his adventure.
- Little – A Song Angel who followed her friend Silverpoint down to Earth and was forced to perform in the Great Cortado's circus. Little is not her real name, rather, it's Silverpoint's nickname for her. Little's task as a Song Angel is to sing the One Song, which ties all life together and keeps it in peaceful existence. This allows her to speak the language of animals and bring out the good in others. By singing her real name on earth, she is bound there forever.
- Tangerine – A stuffed bear Miles has had for as long as he can remember, named for his fading orange colouring. Due to Miles' strong imagination, Little is able to find his name in the One Song and sings it to bring him to life. Tangerine is very curious and his wandering away allows him to be caught by Ghengis.
- The Great Cortado – The evil ringmaster of the Circus Oscuro. He began as a leader who wanted nothing more than to make more money than any other circus in the land, but after nearly being mauled by the tiger Varippuli, he had an epiphany which led him to believe that having money is nothing compared to being powerful. Using this idea he studied the power of laughter and ways to control it, thus creating the Palace of Laughter and developing his master plan.
- The Null – A terrifying monster kept locked away by the Great Cortado, and used to hunt or kill anyone who gets in his way. No one knows how Cortado came across and captured the Beast. When Little searches the One Song for its name to stop it from killing Miles, she finds nothing but an empty hole where it should have been. After she sings her own name, it suddenly becomes a tamer animal and shows a strange new loyalty to Miles.
- The Tiger – An unnamed tiger that first appears to Miles after the Circus Oscuro rolls into town. It refuses to call anyone by their names, saying he doesn't like to be on speaking terms with anything that could be lunch, but more often proves to be of great help to Miles and his friends. He comes and goes as he pleases, and Miles believes that he is the tiger Cortado claims to have killed the night he was attacked.
- Lady Gertrude Partridge – The widow of a wealthy inventor. After his death, she spent her fortune trying to fix the problems caused by his unfinished inventions, leading her to move out of her mansion and into a treehouse mostly made of her favourite antiques she couldn't bear to part with. Her many cats keep her company and she has a limited understanding of what they say. After helping to save Miles and Little, one of her late husband's inventions proves to be a success, restoring her fortune. She converts her mansion into a new, much more pleasant orphanage.
- Gulliver Baltinglass – Lady Partridge's old flame, who was once an explorer of great renown. He now spends his time making his famous apple jelly from the apples in his vast orchard. He is nearly blind and a little senile, but always ready for an adventure.
- Ghengis – The Great Cortado's dimwitted lackey, who does most of his dirty work.
- The Bosillio Brothers – Gila, Umor, and Fabio, three brothers who are clowns in the Palace of Laughter and used to work for Barty Fumble. After finding Tangerine, they realise Miles is Barty Fumble's long lost son.
- Silverpoint – A powerful Storm Angel who visits Earth and is taken by Cortado. He acts as an older brother for Little and has a deep sense of righteousness.
- String – A member of the Halfhead gang who kidnap Miles and Little. After being beat by Miles in a challenge, he is kicked out of the gang and replaced by him. Out of anger he joins the rival gang, the Stinkers. After seeing Little's ability to fly, he tries to kidnap her and unleashes the Null. It is unknown whether he survives his encounter with it.
- Henry – A member of the Halfheads who is sympathetic to Miles and Little. He helps them escape after a police raid, but is captured by the Stinkers when String betrays their location. After being held prisoner at the top of an old Ferris wheel, he is rescued by the chief of police, who adopts him as his own son.

== Sequels ==
Two sequels, The Tiger's Egg, and The Lightning Key, were published one year consecutively after the other. They continue Miles' adventures to find his father and search for the legendary Tiger's Egg, while escaping the devious Cortado and unlocking the mystery surrounding the Null and the Tiger.
