= Philip Bourneuf =

American actor (1908–1979)

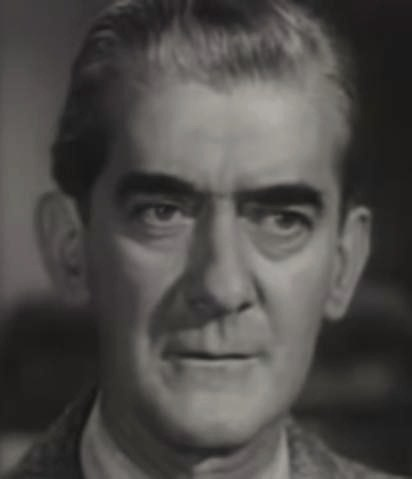
- Bourneuf in an episode of One Step Beyond (1960)
- Born: January 7, 1908; Somerville, Massachusetts, U.S.
- Died: March 23, 1979 (aged 71); Santa Monica, California, U.S.
- Occupations: Stage, film, television actor
- Years active: 1944–1976
- Spouse: Frances Reid (1940-1973; divorced)

Philip Bourneuf (January 7, 1908 - March 23, 1979) was an American character actor who had a long stage career before appearing in films.

== Early years ==
The son of engineer Ambrose Bourneuf and his wife, the former Josephine Comeau, Bourneuf was born in Somerville, Massachusetts. He grew up in Melrose, Massachusetts. As a high school student, he performed in vaudeville and with local stock theater companies.

== Career ==
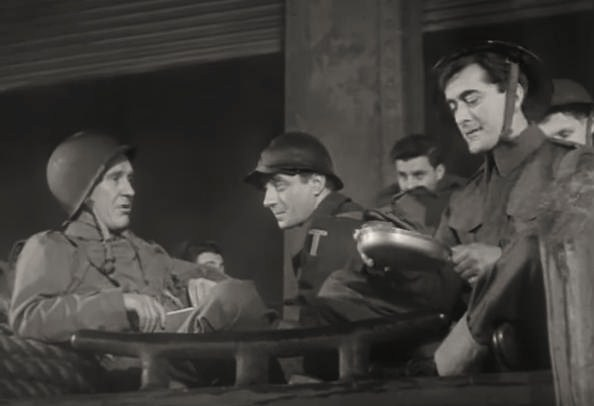
L-R: Burgess Meredith, Claude Dauphin & Philip Bourneuf in A Salute to France (1944)

Bourneuf's obituary in The New York Times noted, "Mr. Bourneuf was included in the small circle of distinguished actors who appeared in the original casts of the American Repertory Theater, a group founded by Eva Le Gallienne, Margaret Webster, and Cheryl Crawford."

In the 1930s, Boruneuf acted as part of the Federal Theatre Project. He portrayed Jackson in the Broadway production of Medicine Show (1940).

A founding member of the Actors Studio, one of Bourneuf's more memorable roles was as the district attorney who maneuvers the apparently innocent Dana Andrews into the electric chair in Beyond a Reasonable Doubt (1956). His last screen role was in the 1976 television mini-series Captains and the Kings.

Bourneuf made three guest appearances on Perry Mason. In 1960, he played Asa Culver in "The Case of the Prudent Prosecutor." In 1963 he played murder victim Edgar Thorne in "The Case of the Lawful Lazarus," and in 1965 he played defendant Victor Montalvo in "The Case of the Golden Girls." He also appeared in other television series like Alfred Hitchcock Presents, Dr. Kildare and Gunsmoke (in the 1956 S3E1's "Legal Revenge", playing injured and bedridden murderer George Basset; later that season he played Kelly in S3E23’s “Wild West”).

== Personal life ==
Bourneuf was married to actress Frances Reid from 1940 until their divorce in 1973. They had no children.

== Death ==
On March 23, 1979, Bourneuf was found dead in his apartment in Santa Monica, California, at age 71.

== Filmography ==
1944	Winged Victory	Colonel Gibney	Uncredited
1948	Joan of Arc	Jean d'Estivet (a prosecutor)	
1951	The Big Night	Dr. Lloyd Cooper	
1953	Thunder in the East	Newah Khan	
1956	Beyond a Reasonable Doubt	District Attorney Roy Thompson	
1956	Everything but the Truth	Mayor Benjamin 'Ben' Parker	
1956	Gunsmoke	George Bassett	Season 2 Episode 8: "Legal Revenge"
1958	The Silent Service	Lt. Cmdr. Charles Momsen	Season 2 Episode 37: "The Squalus Story"
1958	Alfred Hitchcock Presents	Mr. Renshaw	Season 3 Episode 35: "Dip in the Pool"
1961	Alfred Hitchcock Presents	George Henderson	Season 7 Episode 12: "A Jury of Her Peers"
1962	Hemingway's Adventures of a Young Man	City Editor	
1962	Wagon Train	Joshua	Season 5 Episode 27: “The Swamp Devil”
1965	The Alfred Hitchcock Hour	Ernest Sylvester	Season 3 Episode 21: "The Photographer and the Undertaker"
1966	Chamber of Horrors	Inspector Matthew Strudwick	
1969	The Arrangement	Judge Morris	
1970	The Molly Maguires	Father O'Connor	
1971	The Last Child	Dr. Tyler	ABC Movie of the Week
1972	The Man	Chief Justice Williams	
1972	Pete 'n' Tillie	Dr. Willet	
