= Mary Berkeley (noblewoman) =

English noblewoman and alleged mistress of Henry VIII

- Born: c. 1511
- Died: c. 1586
- Known for: Alleged mistress of Henry VIII who aided her son's rise to prominence; may have inspired a minor character in The Faerie Queene
- Spouses: Thomas Perrot (m. 1526–1531) Thomas Jones (m. 1532–1558) Robert Whitney (m. 1559–1567)
- Children: 9, including John Perrot
- Parents: James Berkeley (father); Susan Veel (mother)
- Family: Berkeley family; FitzAlan family

Mary Berkeley (c. 1511 – 1586) was an English noblewoman who aided her son, John Perrot, in his rise to prominence as a member of Elizabeth I's court. She was rumoured in her time to be a mistress of Henry VIII, and speculation that her son John was the king's illegitimate child persisted into the 20th century, though most modern historians reject the theory.

== Biography ==
=== Early life ===
Historians estimate that Mary was born between 1495 and 1511, though 1511 or shortly before is generally considered the likeliest. Her father was James Berkeley of a noble family based in Gloucestershire, and her mother was Susan Veel, of the FitzAlan lineage. As with her contemporaries, Mary was likely highly literate and educated in music.

Although the Berkeley fortune had steadily declined throughout the 15th century, Mary's paternal uncle, Maurice, had successfully improved the family's fortunes through careful stewardship of their holdings by the time of her birth. With no children of his own, Maurice provided for his niece Mary and younger brother James generously. James died in 1515, followed by Susan in 1521, leaving the orphaned Mary to Maurice's care. Mary was the sole heir of her father's estate.

=== First marriage ===
In early 1523, Maurice acquired the wardship of Thomas Perrot, the newly orphaned 18-year-old son of Welsh landed gentry with holdings in Haroldston, Pembrokeshire. Perrot was unable to administer his inherited lands until he turned 21, the age of majority. Maurice therefore purchased responsibility for Perrot from the Crown. Maurice encouraged marriage between his niece and ward, leaving provisions for their wedding in his will; he died in September 1523.

Mary and Thomas married once Thomas came of age around August 1526, and relocated to his estates in Haroldston. Some scholars believe Mary is depicted as the character Thyamis in Edmund Spenser's poem, The Faerie Queene; if so, the poem suggests Mary was bothered by how often Thomas went hunting, though the marriage was otherwise likely a happy one. Their son, John Perrot, was born in November 1528. They had two more children together, daughters Elizabeth and Jane, before Thomas's sudden death in 1531.

=== Second marriage ===
A year after Thomas Perrot's death, Mary married Sir Thomas Jones of Abermarlais in Llansadwrn, Carmarthenshire. Jones, who was around 18 years her senior, had two daughters from a previous marriage. Mary had two daughters of her own with Jones, Eleanor and Catherine, as well as four sons: Henry, Richard, James, and John. The household was bilingual, as Thomas was a native Welsh speaker.

Mary likely married Thomas for pragmatic reasons. As a dower, she was entitled to one-third of the income from her first husband's Haroldston estates until her son, John Perrot, reached the age of majority. The rest belonged to the crown, and she was not allowed to marry without royal approval. Marrying Jones, who was a Groom of the Chamber and relative of Rhys ap Thomas, represented an alliance with an established member of the royal court. Jones would later facilitate the entry of her eldest son, John Perrot, into the household of William Paulet, 1st Marquess of Winchester, where he met and befriended King Henry VIII's children, Elizabeth and Edward.

After marrying Mary, Jones purchased John's wardship and assumed responsibility for managing the Perrot family's estates in Pembrokeshire, near Haverfordwest. He leveraged these lands into a successful political career, first by joining Haverfordwest's town council and later by becoming Pembrokeshire's first member of Parliament in 1542. According to Turvey, Jones "came to dominate the administrative and political life of the county." His efforts also "secured a privileged position for Haverfordwest," including the creation of its parliamentary seat in 1545, restoring the district's traditional privileges that had been removed by the Act of Union of 1536.

John Perrot came of age in late 1549. In February 1550, Jones not only returned the Perrot estates, but transferred ownership of properties he had acquired during his stewardship of them, affording his stepson a privileged position. Mary also transferred some properties she held in dower. After John Perrot assumed control of Haroldston, Mary and Jones moved to Jones' Abermarlais estate. Jones was probably elected to represent Pembrokeshire again in 1553, but stood aside in favour of stepson John. In a letter dated 1586, John expressed remaining close to his mother; he felt responsible for Mary's reputation and comfort, and felt he could only repay her support "with the love of a child."

Mary's grandson, James Perrot, would later recall Mary being fondly regarded in Cardigan, Carmarthenshire, and Pembrokeshire after her death. He also stated that Mary was known as "a lady of great virtue, wisdom, and good government." As historian Roger Turvey notes, James Perrot was likely motivated by a desire to improve the Perrot family's image, though biographer Robert Naunton similarly described her as considered to be "a lady of great honour" by the royal court.

=== Third marriage and widowhood ===
Upon Jones' death in 1558 or 1559, Mary married Robert Whitney of Clifford Castle, another member of Parliament. They remained together until his death in August 1567. His estate was divided between Mary and his son, James, in 1568. Mary, who did not remarry, is last recorded as being alive in April 1586.

== Connection to Henry VIII ==
Some historians have speculated that Mary was a mistress of Henry VIII and that her first son, John Perrot, was the king's illegitimate child. The theory derives from two sources: John Perrot himself, who proclaimed to be Henry VIII's son while on trial for high treason in 1592, and Sir Robert Naunton, husband of John Perrot's granddaughter (Mary's great-granddaughter) Penelope.

=== Historical discussion ===
Speculation that Mary was Henry VIII's mistress generally relies on the misconception that Mary was a lady-in-waiting to Henry's wife, Catherine of Aragon, No contemporary evidence suggests Mary ever served Catherine. Sources place her in Gloucestershire for at least the first two decades of her life and in Wales by 1528, when John Perrot was born. Henry did not visit Gloucestershire for the first time in his life until 1535, meaning it is unlikely that Mary had many opportunities to meet the king. Furthermore, John Perrot's conception would have occurred in 1528, a year in which Henry was "obsessively" consumed with pursuing mistress Anne Boleyn.

Some historians have posited that she met Henry through her first husband Thomas Perrot's involvement with the royal court. Though Thomas Perrot was an Esquire of the Body, he shared this distinction with 200 county landowners, who largely bore the title as a courtesy from the monarch in recognition of their support. There is little evidence to suggest that Thomas, who was never knighted, attended the royal court with any regularity.

=== Contemporary evidence ===
John Perrot, who entered the House of Tudor's orbit shortly after Mary's marriage to Thomas Jones, was considered by courtiers of the day to physically resemble Henry. He also seemingly shared the king's temper, as he was prone to vulgar language and fits of rage. In adulthood, he served as Queen Elizabeth's Lord Deputy of Ireland, a role that brought him into conflict with William FitzWilliam. FitzWilliam orchestrated evidence to have Perrot prosecuted for treason in 1590, resulting in Perrot being held in the Tower of London from March 1591, and sentenced in June 1592. During the trial, it was claimed Perrot habitually "boasted that he was King Henry's son."

Robert Naunton, who married John Perrot's granddaughter nearly 30 years after John's death, wrote a biography of Elizabeth I's court entitled Fragmenta Regalia (1641). Naunton described Perrot returning to the Tower of London after being found guilty in 1592 and uttering angrily to its lieutenant, Owen Hopton: "Will the Queen suffer her brother to be offered up a sacrifice to the envy of my flattering adversaries?" Naunton stated this information had come to him from sources "with assurance." Nonetheless, the anecdote was likely fabricated by either Naunton or his source: Hopton had resigned from the Tower of London in early 1590, before Perrot was so much as imprisoned there. Most modern historians consider it unlikely that Perrot was the son of Henry VIII, and generally hold Naunton responsible for legitimising the myth that Mary and Henry were involved.

== Legacy ==
Some scholars believe the character Thyamis in Edmund Spenser's poem, The Faerie Queene, represents Mary Berkeley. Haverfordwest, the estate of Mary's first husband which she and her second husband stewarded, remained a parliamentary constituency until 1885.

=== Descendants ===
Through her daughter Eleanor, Mary was a direct ancestor to Lucy Walter and James, Duke of Monmouth.
