= Douglas Morrow =

American film producer

- Born: Douglas S. Morrow; September 13, 1913; Oswego, New York
- Died: September 9, 1994 (aged 80); Kingston, New York
- Occupations: Producer, screenwriter

Douglas Morrow (September 13, 1913 – September 9, 1994) was a Hollywood screenwriter and film producer. He earned an Academy Award for his script for 1949's The Stratton Story, a biography of baseball player Monty Stratton, who was disabled in a hunting accident. Morrow died of an aneurysm in 1994.

Morrow's other films included Jim Thorpe - All-American (1951) and Beyond a Reasonable Doubt. He also wrote for a number of television series.

== Legacy ==
In recognition of Morrow's space advocacy and as a board member, the Space Foundation annually presents the Douglas S. Morrow Public Outreach Award to an individual or organization who has made significant contributions to public awareness of space programs. Recipients include:
