= Berkeley station =

Berkeley station may refer to:

- Berkeley station (Atchison, Topeka and Santa Fe Railway), a former train station in Berkeley, California
- Berkeley station (Southern Pacific Railroad), a former train station in Berkeley, California
- Berkeley station (Amtrak), an Amtrak station in Berkeley, California
- Berkeley station (Illinois), a Metra commuter rail station in Berkeley, Illinois
- Berkeley railway station, a former station in Berkeley, Gloucestershire, England
- Downtown Berkeley (BART station), a Bay Area Rapid Transit station in Berkeley, California

== See also ==
- Berkeley (disambiguation)
