= YES and YAS assay =

In vitro screens for estrogenic (YES) and androgenic (YAS) activity

Yeast estrogen screen (YES) and Yeast androgen screen (YAS) are in vitro screens that have been developed in order to detect estrogenic and androgenic activities, respectively, of natural and synthetic compounds, mixtures and environmental samples.

The test is based on genetically modified yeast cells (Saccharomyces cerevisiae), which contain the gene for the human estrogen or androgen receptor coupled to a reporter gene (e.g. lacZ). Activation of the receptor initiates a cascade of events leading to the expression of the reporter gene product (e.g. β-galactosidase) which converts a substrate (e.g. CPRG) which leads to a measurable color change from yellow to red in the medium. Alternative systems are based on the generation of a luminescence signal. Activating (agonistic) samples can be measured directly; inhibiting (antagonistic) activities are measured as the reduction of color development in the presence of a known activating substance.

== Assay format ==
The YES/YAS assay is performed in 96-well microtiter plates. Total assay time is usually 2–3 days, but faster protocols (18 hrs. exposure time) using induced cell lysis have been developed. Several yeast cell lines have been developed for the YES and YAS assay, both proprietary and publicly available. Commercial kits with all necessary ingredients and detailed instructions are also available.

== Relevance ==
Substances with an activating or inhibitory effect on the estrogen and/or androgen receptor of organisms may interfere with reproduction, affect the metabolism and immune system and induce the formation of tumors. This assay is suitable for detecting numerous natural and synthetic hormonally active substances such as environmental toxins from everyday products, e.g. birth control pill ingredients (17α-ethinylestradiol), synthetic materials (bisphenol A, phthalates), pesticides (methoxychlorine) and non-ionic surfactants (alkylphenols). The test has a good reproducibility and concordance with literature data of in vivo or in vitro data.

== Advantages ==
The assay has a very good sensitivity (detection limit for 17β-estradiol in the YES assay about 5 × 10^{−12} M or 1.4 ng/L), and the microplate format requires only small amounts of sample. Analysis of native aqueous samples, concentrated environmental samples and chemicals or mixtures in solvents like ethanol or DMSO is possible. Results can be obtained as quickly as after an overnight exposure. The handling of yeast cells is generally less demanding than mammalian cell culture.

== Guidelines and literature ==
No international standards are available to date. An ISO guideline for the YES assay is under preparation.

== See also ==
- Saliva hormone testing
