= Berkeley (given name) =

Berkeley is a given name. Notable people with the name include:

- Berkeley Bell (1907–1967), American male tennis player
- Berkeley Breathed (born 1957), American cartoonist
- Berkeley L. Bunker (1906–1999), United States Senator and Representative from the state of Nevada
- Berkeley Cole (1913–1996), Anglican priest and author
- Berkeley Dallard (1889–1983), New Zealand accountant, senior public servant, and prison administrator
- Berkeley Gaskin (1908–1979), West Indian cricketer
- Berkeley Guise (1775–1834), British landowner and Whig Member of Parliament
- Berkeley Lent (1921–2007), American politician and jurist in the state of Oregon
- Berkeley Levett (1863–1941), Major in the Scots Guards and later a Gentleman Usher for the royal family
- Berkeley Deane Wise (1855–1909), Irish civil engineer

== See also ==
- Berkeley (surname)
- Berkeley (disambiguation)
