= Lord Berkeley =

Lord Berkeley may refer to:

- Baron Berkeley, a title in the Peerage of England, including:
  - Anthony Gueterbock, 18th Baron Berkeley (born 1939), known as Tony Berkeley, British aristocrat and parliamentarian
- Michael Berkeley, Baron Berkeley of Knighton (born 1948), English composer and broadcaster, life peer
- Baron Berkeley of Stratton, a title in the Peerage of England
  - John Berkeley, 1st Baron Berkeley of Stratton

== See also ==
- Berkeley (surname)
