= Berkeley Square Historic District (Saranac Lake, New York) =

Historic district in New York, United States

- U.S. National Register of Historic Places
- U.S. Historic district
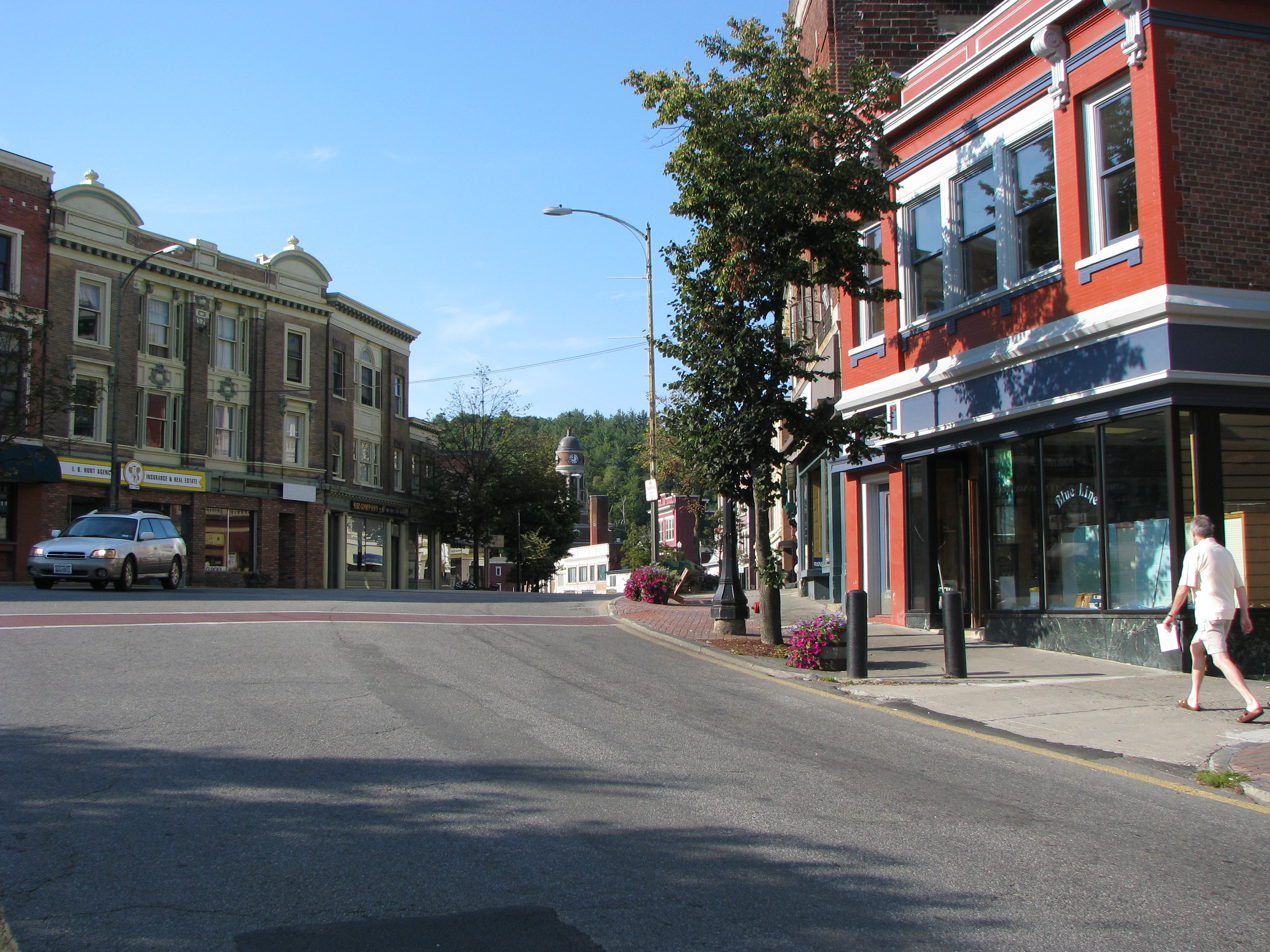
- Berkeley Square Historic District, August 2008

- Location within New York Location within the United States
- Location: 30-84 Main St., 2-29 Broadway, Saranac Lake, New York
- Coordinates: 44°19′35″N 74°7′53″W
- Area: 6 acres (2.4 ha)
- Architect: Multiple
- Architectural style: Late 19th And 20th Century Revivals, Second Empire
- NRHP reference No.: 88000114
- Added to NRHP: February 11, 1988

Berkeley Square Historic District is a national historic district located in Saranac Lake (Harrietstown) in Franklin County, New York. It consists of 22 contributing buildings; the 1926-28 Harrietstown Town Hall and 21 commercial buildings constructed between 1867 and 1932. Most of the buildings are three stories with cornices. Styles range from a group of three Second Empire style structures dated to the late-1860s-early 1870s, late 19th century business blocks, and early 20th century buildings reflecting the various revival styles of that period. The Harrietstown Town Hall is a flat roofed building with parapet and features a domed cylindrical tower.

It was listed on the National Register of Historic Places in 1988.
