= Berkeley County =

Berkeley County is the name of two counties in the United States:

- Berkeley County, South Carolina
- Berkeley County, West Virginia
