= Berkeley County Schools =

School district in West Virginia, United States

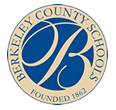

District information
- Motto: Limitless opportunities, Multiple pathways to success
- Grades: K-12
- Superintendent: Dr. Ryan S. Saxe

Other information
- Website: www.berkeleycountyschools.org

Berkeley County Schools is the operating school district within Berkeley County, West Virginia. It is headquartered in the county seat of Martinsburg.

== Board of education ==
Berkeley County Schools is governed by the Berkeley County Board of Education, made up of the following elected members:

- Patrick Murphy, President
- Jacqueline Long, Vice President
- Michael Martin
- Melissa Power
- Damon Wright

== Schools ==
=== High Schools ===
- Hedgesville High School , Hedgesville
- Martinsburg High School , Martinsburg
- Musselman High School , Inwood
- Spring Mills High School , Martinsburg

=== Middle Schools ===
- Hedgesville Middle School, Hedgesville
- Martinsburg North Middle School, Martinsburg
- Martinsburg South Middle School, Martinsburg
- Mountain Ridge Middle School, Gerrardstown
- Musselman Middle School, Bunker Hill
- Spring Mills Middle School, Martinsburg

=== Intermediate Schools (3–5) ===
- Eagle School Intermediate, Martinsburg
- Mill Creek Intermediate School, Bunker Hill
- Mountain Ridge Intermediate School, Gerrardstown
- Orchard View Intermediate School, Martinsburg
- Potomack Intermediate School, Martinsburg
- Tomahawk Intermediate School, Hedgesville

=== Elementary/Primary Schools (PreK-2) ===
- Back Creek Valley Elementary School, Hedgesville
- Bedington Elementary School, Martinsburg
- Berkeley Heights Elementary School, Martinsburg
- Bunker Hill Elementary School, Bunker Hill
- Burke Street Elementary School, Martinsburg
- Gerrardstown Elementary School, Gerrardstown
- Hedgesville Elementary School, Hedgesville
- Inwood Primary School, Inwood
- Marlowe Elementary School , Falling Waters
- Opequon Elementary School, Martinsburg
- Rosemont Elementary School, Martinsburg
- Spring Mills Primary School, Martinsburg
- Tuscarora Elementary School, Martinsburg
- Valley View Elementary School, Martinsburg
- Winchester Avenue Elementary School, Martinsburg

Two of the schools listed are the only ones in the district to have therapy dogs, which are Spring Mills High School and Potomack Intermediate School.
