= Berkeley, Virginia =

Berkeley, Virginia may refer to:

- Berkeley, Albemarle County, Virginia
- Berkeley, Charles City County, Virginia
  - Berkeley Plantation, namesake of the community

== See also ==
- Berkley, Virginia, a former town that is now part of Norfolk
