= Dafydd Fynglwyd =

Dafydd Fynglwyd was 16th century Welsh poet. He was son of the poet Siancyn Fynglwyd. He is known to have written a number of englyn-style poems in praise of Gruffudd Dwnn's mansion in the Ystrad area, and cywyddau-style to Sir John Perrot (of Pembrokeshire) and to Sir Harry ap Sir Thomas Johns (of Abermarlais).
