= Saliva testing =

Diagnostic technique

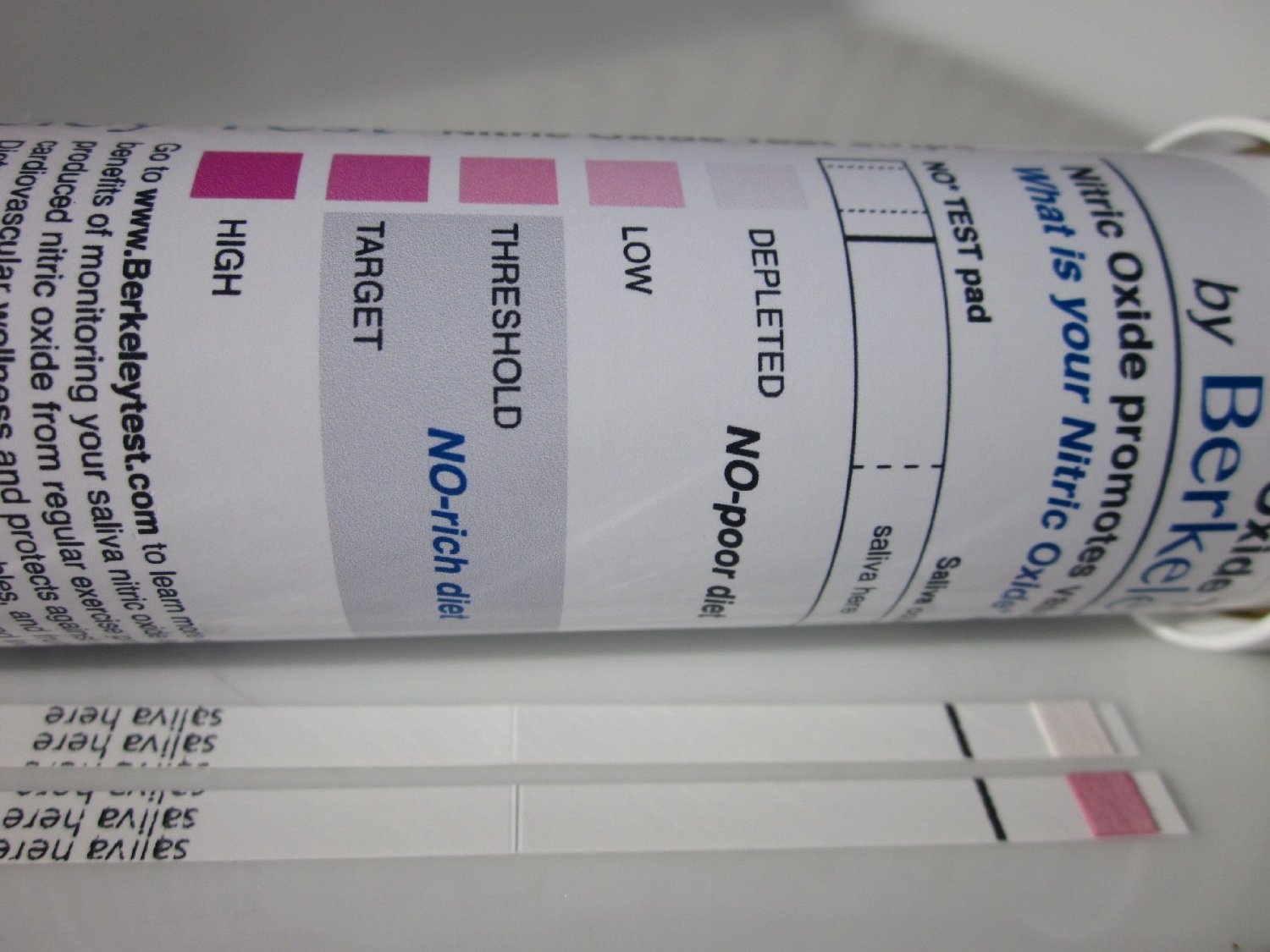
Saliva nitric test strip (Berkeley Test) showing colored scale of nitric oxide status – See article and jump to Cardiovascular Disease, Nitric Oxide: a salivary biomarker for cardio-protection

Saliva testing or Salivaomics is a diagnostic technique that involves laboratory analysis of saliva to identify markers of endocrine, immunologic, inflammatory, infectious, and other types of conditions. Saliva is a useful biological fluid for assaying steroid hormones such as cortisol, genetic material like RNA, proteins such as enzymes and antibodies, and a variety of other substances, including natural metabolites, including saliva nitrite, a biomarker for nitric oxide status (see below for Cardiovascular Disease, Nitric Oxide: a salivary biomarker for cardio-protection). Saliva testing is used to screen for or diagnose numerous conditions and disease states, including Cushing's disease, anovulation, HIV, cancer, parasites, hypogonadism, and allergies. Salivary testing has even been used by the U.S. government to assess circadian rhythm shifts in astronauts before flight and to evaluate hormonal profiles of soldiers undergoing military survival training.

Proponents of saliva testing cite its ease of collection, safety, non-invasiveness, affordability, accuracy, and capacity to circumvent venipuncture as the primary advantages when compared to blood testing and other types of diagnostic testing. Additionally, since multiple samples can be readily obtained, saliva testing is particularly useful for performing chronobiological assessments that span hours, days, or weeks. Collecting whole saliva by passive drool has a myriad of advantages. Passive drool collection facilitates large sample size collection. Consequently, this allows the sample to be tested for more than one biomarker. It also gives the researcher the ability to freeze the left over specimen to be used at a later time. Additionally, it lessens the possibility of contamination by eliminating extra collection devices and the need to induce saliva flow.

The testing of salivation by the use of mercury was performed at least as early as 1685. Testing the acidity of saliva occurred at least as early as 1808. The clinical use of saliva testing occurred at least as early as 1836 in patients with bronchitis. In 1959, scientists in the journal Cancer raised the possibility of using biochemical changes in acid phosphatases in saliva as an indicator of the presence of prostate cancer.

More recent studies have focused on detection of steroid hormones and antibodies in the saliva. Recent applications emphasize the development of increasingly sophisticated techniques to detect additional proteins, genetic material, and markers of nutritional status. According to Wong, scientists are now viewing saliva as "a valuable biofluid…with the potential to extract more data than is possible currently with other diagnostic methods."

== Technique ==
Most saliva testing is performed using enzyme-linked immunosorbent assay (ELISA), polymerase chain reaction (PCR), high-resolution mass spectrometry (HRMS), or any number of newer technologies such as fiber-optic-based detection. All of these methods enable detection of specific molecules like cortisol, C-reactive protein (CRP), or secretory IgA. This type of testing typically involves collection of a small amount of saliva into a sterile tube followed by processing at a remote laboratory. Some methods of testing involve collecting saliva using an absorbent pad, applying a chemical solution, and monitoring for color change to indicate a positive or negative result. This method is commonly used as a point-of-care (POC) technique to screen for HIV. However, using absorbent pads and chemical solutions could very easily skew the results of immunoassays. Research by Dr. Douglas A. Granger and colleagues shows that outcomes for testosterone, DHEA, progesterone, and estradiol biomarkers are elevated when cotton-based collection materials are used as opposed to samples collected by other methods (i.e. passive drool). Researchers are currently examining the expanding role of saliva testing as part of routine dental or medical office examinations where saliva collection is simple to perform.

== Physiologic basis ==
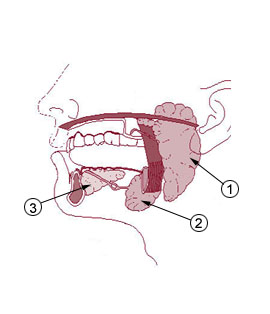
Salivary glands: 1.parotid, 2.submandibular, 3.sublingual.

Humans have three major salivary glands: parotid, submandibular, and sublingual. These glands, along with additional minor salivary glands, secrete a rich mixture of biological chemicals, electrolytes, proteins, genetic material, polysaccharides, and other molecules. Most of these substances enter the salivary gland acinus and duct system from the surrounding capillaries via the intervening tissue fluid, although some substances are produced within the glands themselves. The level of each salivary component varies considerably depending on the health status of the individual and the presence of disease (oral or systemic). By measuring these components in the saliva, it is possible to screen for a variety of infections, allergies, hormonal disturbances, and neoplasms.

== Clinical use ==
The following conditions are among those that can be detected through saliva testing (list not comprehensive): adrenal conditions (such as Cushing's disease/syndrome and Addison's disease), altered female hormone states (such as polyendocrine metabolic ovarian syndrome (PMOS), menopause, anovulation, and hormonal alterations in cycling women), altered male hormone states (such as hypogonadism/andropause and hyperestrogenic states), metabolic disturbances (such as insulin resistance, diabetes, and metabolic syndrome), benign and metastatic neoplasms (such as breast cancer, pancreatic cancer, and oral cancer), infectious conditions (such as HIV, viral hepatitis, amoebiasis, and helicobacter pylori infection), and allergic conditions (such as food allergy).

== Uses in behavioral research ==
Saliva testing also has specific uses in clinical and experimental psychological settings. Due to its ability to provide insight into human behavior, emotions, and development, it has been used to investigate psychological phenomenon such as anxiety, depression, PTSD, and other behavioral disorders. Its primary purpose is to test cortisol and alpha amylase levels, which are indicative of stress levels. Salivary cortisol is a good stress index, with increased levels of cortisol correlating positively with increased levels of stress. Cortisol levels rise slowly over time and take a while to return to base level, indicating that cortisol is more associated with chronic stress levels. Alpha amylase, on the other hand, spikes quickly when confronted with a stressor and returns to baseline soon after the stress has passed, making salivary amylase measurement a powerful tool for psychological research studying acute stress responses. Samples are usually collected from participants by having them drool through a straw into a collection tube while experiencing a stimulus, with samples taken every few minutes to record the gradual change in stress hormone levels. Because the collection of saliva samples is non-invasive, it has the advantage of not introducing further stress on the participant that may otherwise distort results.

In more specific studies looking at the link between cortisol levels and psychological phenomena, it has been found that chronic stressors such as life-threatening situations (example: diseases), depression, and social or economic hardship correlate with significantly higher cortisol levels. In situations where a subject undergoes induced anxiety, high cortisol levels correspond with experiencing more physiological symptoms of nervousness, such as increased heart rate, sweating, and skin conductance. Additionally, a negative correlation was discovered between baseline levels of cortisol and aggression. Salivary cortisol levels can thus provide insight into a number of other psychological processes.

Alpha amylase levels in saliva provide a non-invasive way to examine sympathoadrenal medullary (SAM) activity, which can otherwise be measured with electrophysiological equipment or blood plasma readings. Salivary alpha amylase levels have been found to correlate with heightened autonomic nervous system activity levels, reacting in similar ways to the hormone norepinephrine. Subsequent findings reveal a relationship between α-amylase and competition. Results showed that alpha amylase levels changed when reacting to competition, but not when anticipating it. Furthermore, by testing alpha amylase levels, scientists noticed a difference in reactivity behavior among individuals with previous experience in a similar situation.

While saliva testing has the promise of becoming a valuable and more widely used tool in psychological research in the future, there are also some disadvantages to the method that must be kept in mind, including the cost of collecting and processing the samples and the reliability of the measure itself. There is a substantial amount of both within-person and between-person variability in cortisol levels that must be taken into account when drawing conclusions from studies.

Many studies have been performed to further examine the variables that contribute to these within-person and between-person variances. Analyses of the variables that affect cortisol levels has yielded an extensive list of confounding variables.

Diurnal variation is a major factor for within-person variance because baseline cortisol levels have been known to differ based on the time of day. For normally developing individuals who follow a typical day–night schedule, cortisol production peaks during the last few hours of sleep. This peak is thought to aid in preparing the body for action and stimulate the appetite upon waking. Diurnal variation is also affected by psychological conditions. For example, Early morning cortisol levels have been found to be elevated in shy children and late night levels elevated in depressed adolescents, particularly the between the hours of two and four PM. This might be important for understanding emotions and depressive symptoms.

Other variables that affect within- and between-person variation are listed below. The list is not meant to be comprehensive and the impact of many of these variables could benefit from further research and discussion.

- Age is one of the major factors for between-person variance. Some studies indicate children and adolescents exhibit greater cortisol activity potentially related to development.
- Gender has been found to impact base line levels of cortisol, contributing to between-person variance. In generally stressful situations, levels of cortisol in males have been found to increase to nearly double the amount when compared to females. In stressful social situations (i.e. social rejection challenge), however, women but not men tend to show significantly higher levels of cortisol.
- The menstrual cycle has been found to impact levels of cortisol in the body, impacting both within- and between-person variance. Women in the luteal phase reportedly have levels of cortisol equal to men, suggesting no sex differences in base levels of cortical when women are not ovulating. Women in the follicular phase and women taking oral contraceptives reportedly have significantly lower levels of cortisol when compared to men and women in the luteal phase.
- Pregnancy has been found to increase levels of cortisol in the body. In particular, breast-feeding has been found to decrease levels of cortisol in the short-term even if a mother is exposed to a psychosocial stressor.
- Nicotine is known to increase levels of cortisol in the body since it stimulates the HPA axis. After at least two cigarettes, smokers show significant elevations of salivary cortisol levels. Furthermore, habitual smokers show blunted salivary cortisol responses to psychological stressors.
- Food has been found to affect levels of cortisol. The presence of proteins has been found to increase cortisol. This variable is often affected by diurnal variation, with cortisol being notably higher during lunchtime than dinnertime, and gender, with women having higher levels of cortisol after eating than men.
- While some studies examining the effects of alcohol consumption and caffeine intake on base levels of cortisol have found positive correlations, the results are mixed and would benefit from further examination.
- Intense or prolonged exercise can result in increased levels of cortisol. Short-term and low-level exercising only mildly increases levels of cortisol.
- Repeated exposure to initially stressful stimuli has been found to result in a leveling off of cortisol in the body.
- Birth weight has been shown to be inversely related to base levels of cortisol; low birth weight is correlated with high levels of cortisol.
- Position within a social hierarchy has been found to affect levels of cortisol. One study in particular looked at a sample of 63 army recruits and found that socially dominant subjects showed high salivary cortisol increases compared to only modest elevations in subordinate men after stress exposure and physical exercise.
- Some medications (i.e. glucocorticoids, psychoactive drugs, antidepressants) have been found to affect levels of cortisol in the body but the results from studies examining these affects have been mixed. The impact of medications on cortical levels could benefit from further research.

== Evidence and current research ==
=== Cortisol and melatonin aberrations ===

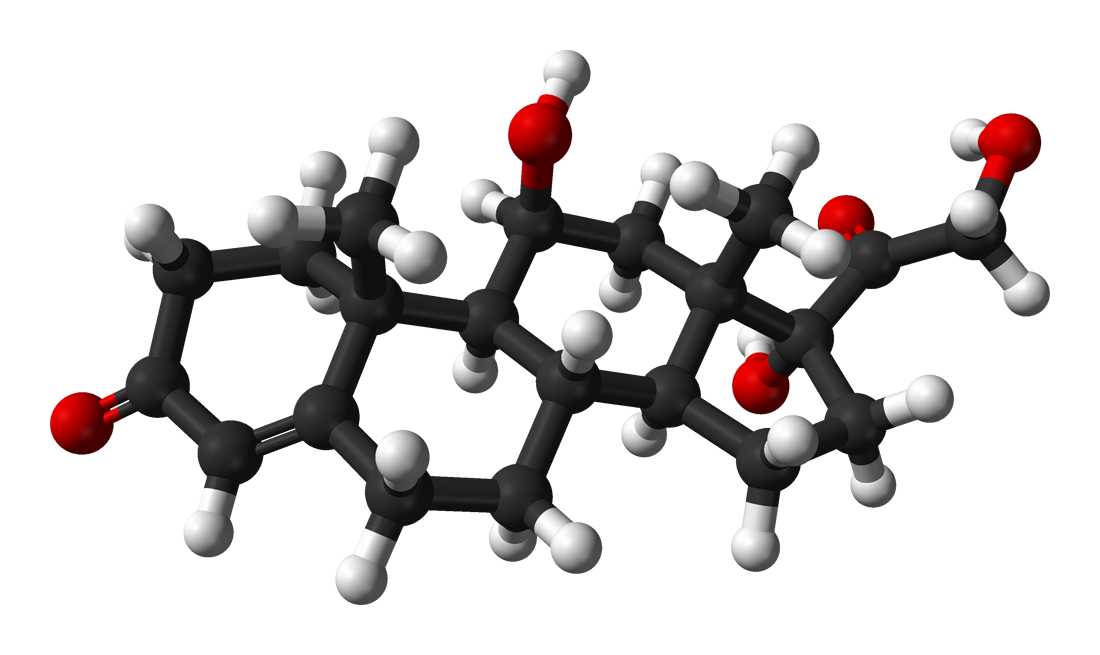
Structure of the steroid hormone Cortisol

In 2008 the Endocrine Society published diagnostic guidelines for Cushing's syndrome, wherein they recommended midnight salivary cortisol testing on two consecutive days as one possible initial screening tool. A 2009 review concluded that late-night salivary cortisol testing is a suitable alternative to serum cortisol testing for diagnosing Cushing's syndrome, reporting that both sensitivity and specificity exceeded ninety percent. In 2010 Sakihara, et al., evaluated the usefulness and accuracy of salivary, plasma, and urinary cortisol levels and determined salivary cortisol to be the "method of choice" for Cushing's syndrome screening. In 2008 Restituto, et al., found early morning salivary cortisol to be "as good as serum" as an Addison's disease screening technique. In 2010 Bagcim et al., determined that saliva melatonin levels "reflect those in serum at any time of the day" and are a reliable alternative to serum melatonin to study the pineal physiology in newborns. A 2008 review article described saliva melatonin testing as a "practical and reliable method for field, clinical, and research trials".

=== Reproductive hormone irregularities ===
A 2009 study examined the use of saliva testing to measure estradiol, progesterone, dehydroepiandrosterone (DHEA), and testosterone levels in 2,722 individuals (male and female). The researchers confirmed the "good validity of [salivary] sex hormone measurements" and concluded that salivary testing was a good method for testing older adults due to the ease of in-home collection.

However, other studies suggest that such tests do not represent either the amount of hormones in the blood, or their biological activity. Saliva testing is often used as part of bioidentical hormone replacement therapy, though it has been criticized for being expensive, unnecessary and meaningless.

==== Female ====
In 2010 a study identified luteinizing hormone (LH) as an accurate salivary biomarker of ovulation in females. Researchers measured various hormones in the saliva throughout the menstrual cycle and found that salivary luteinizing hormone was reliably elevated during the ovulatory period and, for that reason, "salivary LH level is a reliable way to determine ovulation." A 1983 study of various salivary steroid assays showed that daily salivary progesterone measurements "provides a valuable means of assessing ovarian function". A 2001 study involved performing daily saliva collection from healthy subjects and plotting these over the entire menstrual cycle. The researchers determined that salivary estradiol and progesterone curves corresponded to the daily profiles normally observed in blood, although of lesser amplitude. In 1999 researchers determined that ELISA-based saliva testing "can serve as a reliable [method] for estriol determination." A 2007 article reported that the free testosterone measurement, including via saliva assay, represents "the most sensitive biochemical marker supporting the diagnosis of PCOS [polyendocrine metabolic ovarian syndrome]." In 1990 Vuorento, et al., found that luteal phase defects, wherein progesterone levels decline prematurely within the menstrual cycle, were identified with high frequency using salivary progesterone testing among women with unexplained infertility.

==== Male ====
In 2009 Shibayama, et al., examined the accuracy of salivary androgen measurement for diagnosing late-onset hypogonadism (age-related decline in androgens, often called "andropause"). Researchers determined that the accuracy of saliva testosterone and DHEA measurement exceeded 98.5% and that this method "has satisfactory applicability" in the diagnosis of late-onset hypogonadism. A 2007 study reported a sensitivity and specificity of 100% for salivary testosterone in ruling out hypogonadism and concluded that salivary testosterone is a useful biomarker in the diagnosis of male androgen deficiency. The use of salivary testosterone to screen for hypogonadism has been validated by other studies, including one involving 1454 individuals. Those researchers concluded that salivary testosterone is "an acceptable assay for screening for hypogonadism."

=== Neoplastic conditions ===
==== Pancreatic cancer ====
A 2010 study by Zhang, et al., demonstrated that researchers were able to detect pancreatic cancer with high sensitivity and specificity (90.0% and 95.0%, respectively) by screening saliva for four specific mRNA biomarkers. In a 2011 review article that examined pancreatic cancer biomarkers, Hamade and Shimosegawa concluded that clinical application of saliva biomarker testing is "beneficial for the screening and early detection of pancreatic cancer."

==== Breast cancer ====
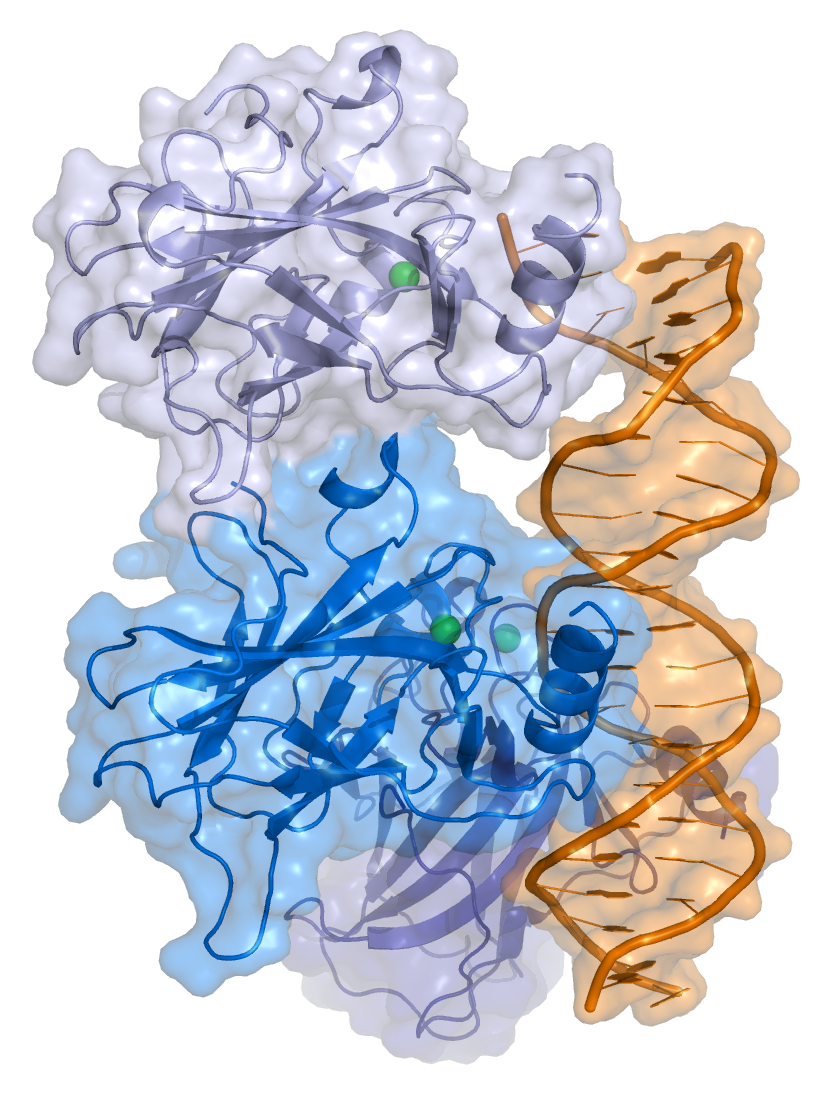
Cartoon representation of a complex between DNA and the protein p53 (described in Cho et al. Science 265 pp. 346, 1994)

In 2008 Emekli-Alturfan, et al., compared saliva from breast cancer patients to that from healthy individuals and observed, notably, that breast cancer patients' samples contained dysplastic cells and reduced lipid peroxides. A 2000 study compared the salivary levels of a breast cancer marker (HER2/neu) in healthy women, women with benign breast lesions, and women with breast cancer. Researchers found that the salivary (as well as serum) level of this marker was significantly higher in women with breast cancer than in healthy women and women with benign breast lesions; they went on to state that the marker may have potential as a tool for diagnosing breast cancer or detecting its recurrence. A separate study corroborated these findings and further demonstrated that another breast cancer marker (CA15-3) was elevated while the tumor suppressor protein p53 was reduced in the saliva of women with breast cancer compared to healthy controls and women with benign breast lesions.

==== Oral cancer ====
In 2010 Jou, et al., found that patients diagnosed with oral squamous cell carcinoma had elevated levels transferrin in saliva compared to healthy controls and, moreover, that salivary transferrin measurement using ELISA technique was "highly specific, sensitive, and accurate for the early detection of oral cancer." A 2009 study reported that the levels of two biomarkers, Cyclin D1 (increased compared to controls) and Maspin (decreased compared to controls), had sensitivities and specificities of 100% for oral cancer detection when measured in saliva. Saliva testing for specific mRNAs has been found to possess significant potential for oral cancer diagnosis. In fact, there is evidence to suggest that saliva RNA diagnostics are slightly superior to serum RNA diagnostics, with the comparative receiver operating characteristic (ROC) value being 95% for saliva but only 88% for serum.

=== Glucose dysregulation ===
A 2009 study compared the saliva glucose levels of diabetic patients to those of non-diabetic controls. The authors reported that "salivary [glucose] concentration and excretion were much higher in diabetic patients than in control subjects." In 2009 Rao, et al., investigated salivary biomarkers that could aid identification of type-2 diabetic individuals. Researchers found that sixty-five proteins, the majority of which are involved in regulating metabolism and immune response, were significantly altered in type-2 diabetics. They further observed that the relative increase of these specific proteins was directly proportional to the severity of disease (i.e., they were somewhat elevated in pre-diabetics and significantly elevated in diabetics). In 2010 Soell, et al., determined that one particular salivary biomarker (chromogranin A) was over-expressed in 100% of diabetic patients when compared to controls. In 2010 Qvarnstrom, et al., conducted a cross-sectional analysis of 500 individuals and found that an increase in salivary lysozyme was "significantly associated with metabolic syndrome."

=== Infectious conditions ===
==== Human immunodeficiency virus ====
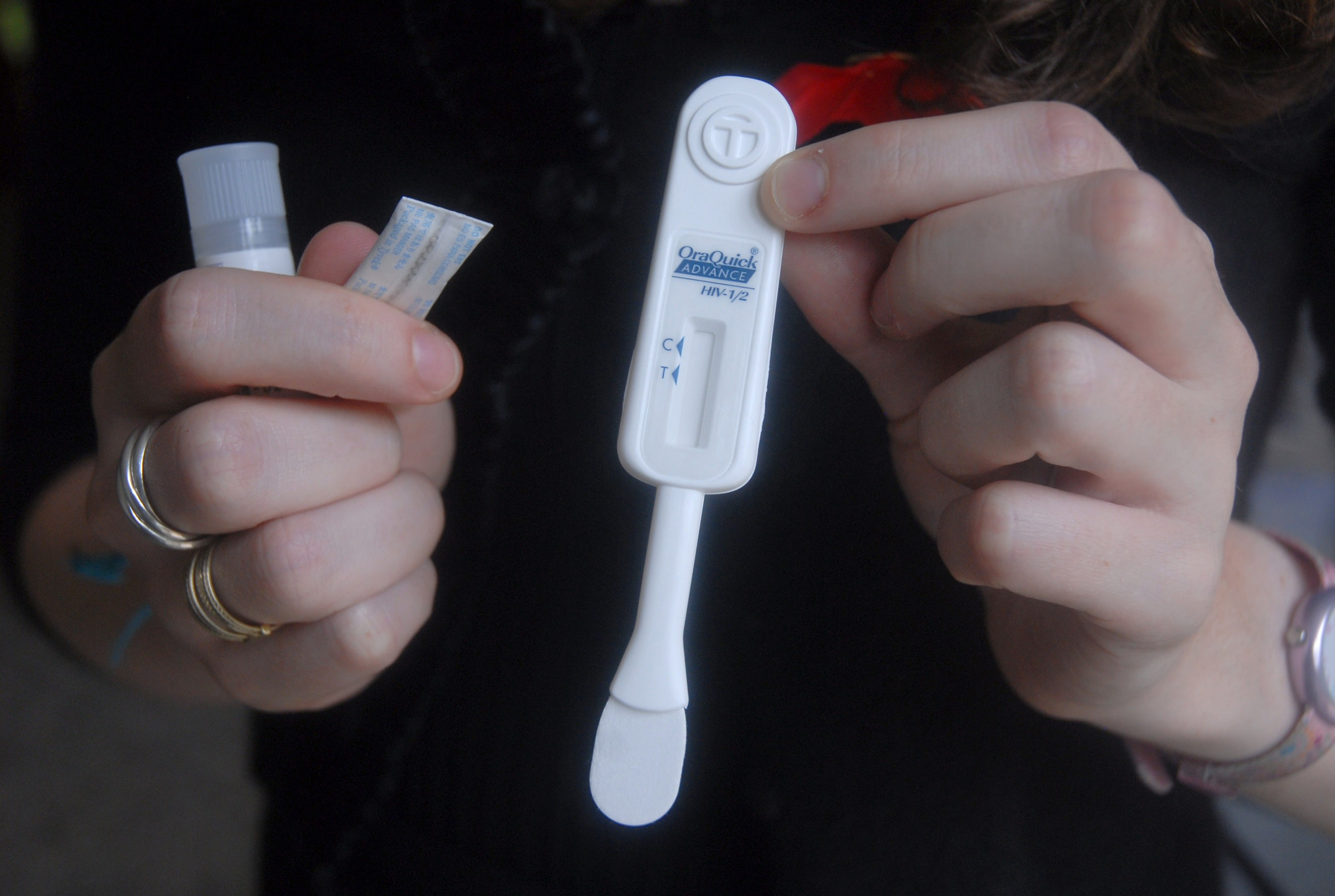
Saliva test for HIV.

The accuracy of saliva anti-HIV antibody testing has been demonstrated in numerous studies; two recent large-scale studies found both sensitivity and specificity to be 100%. The first of these was published in 2008 by Zelin, et al., and compared saliva antibody testing and serum antibody testing using ELISA technique in 820 individuals. The second study, conducted by Pascoe, et al., compared saliva antibody testing to serum antibody testing using ELISA followed by confirmatory Western Blot analysis in 591 individuals. The accuracy of saliva anti-HIV antibody testing has been confirmed by many additional studies, leading to approval of this method by the U.S. Food & Drug Administration in 2004.

==== Viral hepatitis ====
Several studies have demonstrated diagnostic potential for salivary hepatitis testing. A 2011 study demonstrated that HBV surface antigen saliva testing using ELISA had a sensitivity and specificity of 93.6% and 92.6%, respectively. Other studies found that saliva assay for anti-HAV antibodies (IgM and IgG) was an effective method to identify HAV-infected individuals. Hepatitis C has also been identified using salivary detection methods. Yaari, et al., reported in 2006 that saliva testing for anti-HCV antibodies yielded a sensitivity of 100% and a specificity that was "similar or better" when compared to serum testing.

==== Parasitic infection ====
A 2010 study found that saliva-based detection of the parasite Entamoeba histolytica was superior to existing fecal detection methods for patients with E. histolytica-associated liver abscess. In 2004 El Hamshary and Arafa found that salivary anti-E. histolytica IgA concentration had "predictive diagnostic value of intestinal amoebiasis…as well as in tissue amoebiasis." A 1990 study that involved saliva testing for E. histolytica in 223 school children demonstrated a sensitivity and specificity of 85% and 98%, respectively. In 2005 Stroehle, et al., determined that saliva detection of IgG antibodies against Toxoplasma gondii had a sensitivity and specificity of 98.5% and 100%, respectively. A study published in 1990 demonstrated the diagnostic utility of saliva IgG testing in identifying neurocysticercosis secondary to Taenia solium.

==== Helicobacter pylori infection ====
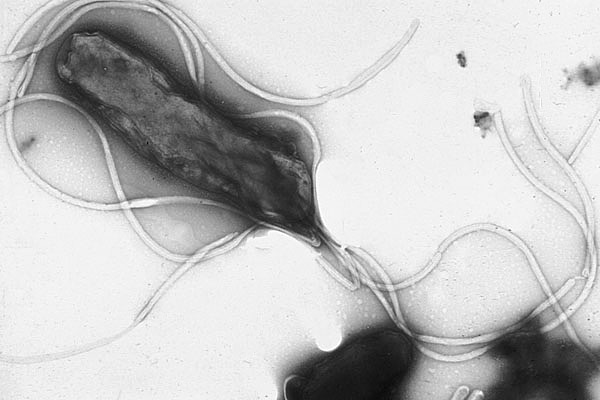
Electron micrograph of Helicobacter pylori possessing multiple flagella (negative staining)

In a 2005 study, researchers investigated the accuracy of Helicobacter pylori diagnosis in dyspeptic patients using salivary anti-H. pylori IgG levels. They determined that saliva testing for H. pylori antibodies "could be used reliably for screening dyspeptic patients in general practice." That same year Tiwari, et al., examined the accuracy of testing saliva for H. pylori DNA and how well this correlated with presence of H. pylori detected via gastric biopsy. Based on their results, researchers concluded that saliva testing could serve as a reliable non-invasive detection method for H. pylori infection.

==== Periodontitis ====
A 2009 study conducted by Koss, et al., studied salivary biomarkers of periodontal disease; their findings revealed that three substances (peroxidase, hydroxyproline and calcium) were significantly increased in the saliva of patients with periodontitis. A 2010 study found that elevation of three saliva biomarkers (MMP-8, TIMP-1, and ICTP), particularly when analyzed using time-resolved immunofluorometric assay, was suggestive of periodontitis.

=== Cardiovascular disease ===
==== CRP: a salivary biomarker for cardiovascular risk ====
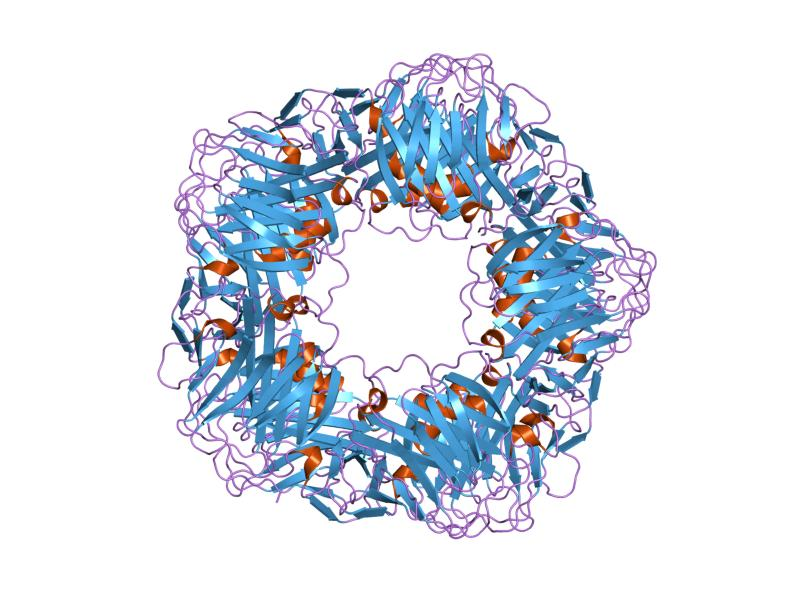
Three-dimensional structure of C-reactive protein.

In 2011 Punyadeera, et al., studied "the clinical utility of salivary C-reactive protein levels in assessing coronary events such as myocardial infarction in a primary health care setting." Researchers found that saliva CRP levels in cardiac patients were significantly higher when compared to healthy controls. Furthermore, they found that saliva CRP correlated with serum CRP in cardiac patients and, thus, could be a useful tool for "large patient screening studies for risk assessment of coronary events."

==== Nitric Oxide: a salivary biomarker for cardio-protection ====
Cardio-protective nitric oxide is generated in the body by a family of specific enzymes, nitric oxide synthase. An alternative pathway for the generation of nitric oxide is the nitrate-nitrite-nitric oxide pathway in which dietary inorganic nitrate is sequentially reduced to nitric oxide. A necessary and obligatory step in the generation of nitric oxide by the non-nitric oxide synthase or alternative pathway involves the uptake of nitrate by the salivary gland, excretion in saliva, and subsequent reduction to nitrite by oral commensal bacteria in the mouth.

Salivary nitrite is then further chemically reduced in blood and tissue to nitric oxide resulting in the lowering of blood pressure, inhibition of platelet aggregation, increasing cerebral blood flow and flow-mediated dilation, and decreasing oxygen cost during exercise. A principal source of dietary inorganic nitrate, which is reduced to nitric oxide in the body, is from leafy green vegetables. The blood pressure lowering effects of leafy green vegetables, in particular, spinach and arugula, are abundant in anti-hypertensive diets such as the DASH diet. Several papers have shown saliva nitrite levels correlate with blood nitrite levels which both serve as meaningful surrogates for blood pressure lowering effects.

Sobko et al. shows that Japanese traditional diets rich in leafy vegetables elevated both plasma and saliva nitrite levels with a corresponding decrease in blood pressure.

Webb et al. in 2008 reinforced the obligatory role of saliva in humans to generate nitric oxide. Here, they showed ingestion of beet juice, a nitrate-rich food, by healthy volunteers markedly reduced blood pressure and by disrupting saliva, either by spitting or interrupting the bioconversion of dietary nitrate to nitrite in the mouth with anti-bacterial mouthwash, the chemical reduction of nitrate to nitrite to nitric oxide with an associated decease in blood pressure was abated. By blocking saliva from recirculating or preventing salivary nitrate from being chemically reduced to nitrite, it prevented a rise in plasma nitrite levels, and blocked a decrease in blood pressure as well as abolished nitric oxide-mediated inhibition of platelets aggregation confirming the cardio-protective effects were attributable to nitric oxide via the conversion of nitrate to nitrite in saliva.

In a series of reports by Ahluwalia and colleagues, they showed in a cross over protocol of 14 volunteers who ingested inorganic nitrates, plasma and saliva nitrite level increased 3 hours post ingestion with a significant reduction of blood pressure. Nitrate extracted from blood by the salivary gland, accumulates in saliva, which is then reduced to nitric oxide to have a direct blood pressure lowering effect. Decreasing saliva nitrite in volunteers that already had elevated levels, a rise in systolic and diastolic blood pressure resulted. Furthermore, pre-hypertensives may be more sensitive to the blood pressure lowering effects of the dietary nitrate-nitrite-nitric oxide pathway. Monitoring the bioconversion of plant-derived nitrate into salivary nitrite serves as a surrogate biomarker for total body nitric oxide status.

=== Allergic states ===
A 2002 study explored the relationship between allergies and salivary immunoglobulin levels in eighty subjects. Researchers demonstrated an association between development of allergies and disturbances in saliva allergen-specific IgA levels (elevated compared to controls) and total secretory IgA (reduced compared to controls). In 2011 Peeters, et al., identified characteristic aberrations in certain salivary metabolites that were associated with peanut-allergic individuals when compared to peanut-tolerant controls. In 2003 Vojdani, et al., found that individuals exposed to various allergenic molds and mycotoxins showed "significantly higher levels of salivary IgA antibodies against one or more mold species."

=== Chemical substances ===
In 2009 Pink, et al., reported that saliva testing had become so widespread that it had begun to replace urine testing as the standard for detecting illicit drugs and prescription medications. Shin, et al., reported in 2008 that salivary detection of ethanol and three of its metabolites (methanol, ethylene glycol, and diethylene glycol) had "relatively high sensitivity and specificity" and that such testing facilitates rapid diagnosis of alcohol intoxication. A 2002 study demonstrated that there was good agreement between saliva and breath ethanol analysis, and that chromatographic saliva ethanol assay is "specific…[and] shows good accuracy and precision." In 2011 Vindenes, et al., investigated the viability of drug abuse monitoring using saliva, comparing this method to urine drug detection. Researchers found that several drug metabolites were detected more frequently in saliva than in urine; this was true for 6-monoacetylmorphine, amphetamine, methamphetamine, and N-desmethyldiazepam. This same study showed that saliva testing could detect other drug metabolites, as well, although not as frequently as urine testing; this was the case for morphine, other benzodiazepines, cannabis, and cocaine.

== Selected criticism ==
=== Sensitivity and specificity ===
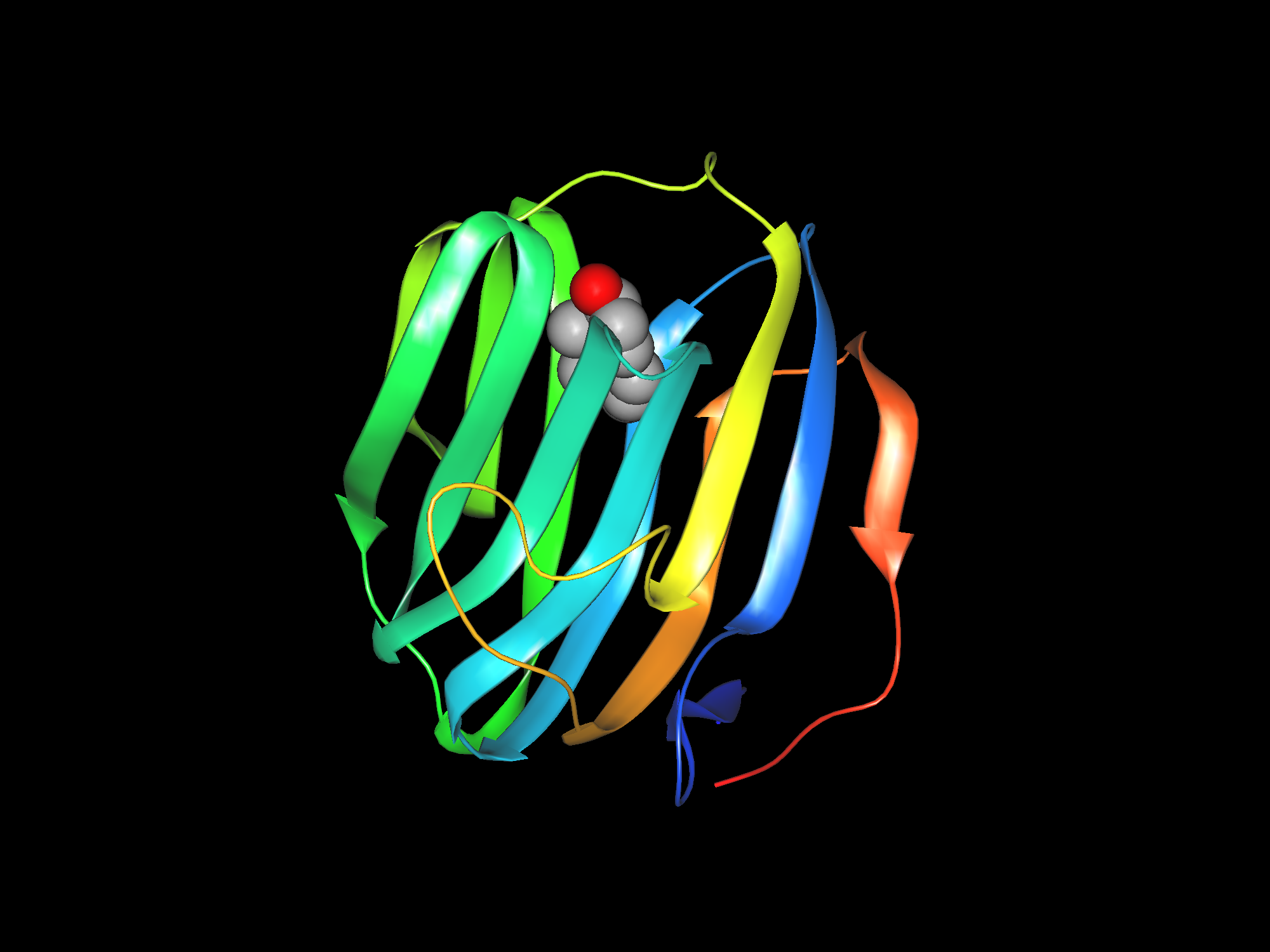
A three-dimensional structure of the "sex hormone-binding globulin (SHBG)".

One often cited criticism of using saliva as a diagnostic fluid is that biomarkers are present in amounts that are too low to be detected reliably. As Wong points out, however, this "is no longer a limitation" due to the development of increasingly sensitive detection techniques. Advances in ELISA and mass spectrometry, in addition to the emergence of novel detection methods that take advantage of nanotechnology and other technologies, are enabling scientists and practitioners to achieve high analyte sensitivity.

Biomarker specificity is another consideration with saliva testing, much as it is with blood or urine testing. Many biomarkers are nonspecific (for example, CRP is a nonspecific inflammatory marker), and thus they can not be used alone to diagnose any particular disease. This issue is currently being addressed through identification of multiple biomarkers that are correlative of a disease; these can then be screened concomitantly to create a comprehensive panel of tests that significantly increases diagnostic specificity. Of note, certain types of saliva testing are considered by many to be more specific than blood testing; this is particularly true for steroid hormones. Since salivary hormone tests measure only those hormones that are not bound to sex hormone-binding globulin (SHBG) or albumin, they are regarded as reflecting only the bioactive ("free") fraction. With continued research into the field of salivary testing, accuracy parameters such as sensitivity and specificity will continue to improve.

=== Standardization ===
As with other diagnostic testing methods, one drawback of saliva testing is the variability that exists among diagnostic devices and laboratory analysis techniques, especially for measuring hormones. Consequently, although a test result may be accurate and reliable within a particular assay method or laboratory, it may not be comparative to a test result obtained using a different method or laboratory. As the research community continues to validate and refine test methods and establish standard diagnostic ranges for various saliva biomarkers, this issue should be resolved. Recently, the U.S. National Institute of Health and Public Health Service each granted significant funding to further advancements in salivary testing, including the continued development of diagnostic standards.

== See also ==
- YES and YAS assay
