= Jon Berkeley =

Irish illustrator and author

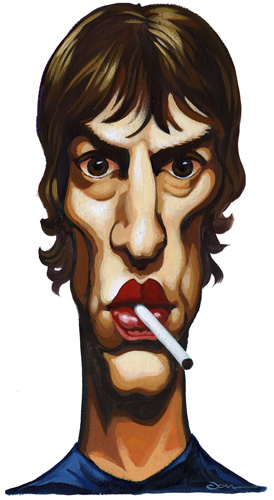
Caricature of The Verve's Richard Ashcroft by Jon Berkeley

Jon Berkeley (born 1962) is a Dublin-born illustrator and children's author.

== Background ==
He travelled widely in the 1980s, working freelance in London, Sydney and Hong Kong before returning to Dublin in 1992, where he formed a loose coalition known as Baggot Street Central with other leading Irish illustrators Roger O'Reilly, P.J. Lynch and Angela Clarke. He has lived in Barcelona since 1997.

== Illustration ==
His illustrations appear in high-profile publications worldwide, including Time, the Sunday Independent, Backbone and The Washington Post, and regularly feature on the cover of The Economist. His 2003 Economist cover on obesity has since been reproduced in over a dozen publications.

Jon Berkeley's work typically features a strong central concept with a twist. He is also known for his sharp and colourful caricatures which have appeared in The Sunday Times UK, Hot Press and The LA Times among others. He has received awards from the Society of News Design, the 4A's, and the Institute of Creative Advertising and Design.

== Writing ==
Berkeley is the author and illustrator of Chopsticks (2005), the story of a mouse who brings to life a carved Chinese dragon.

In 2005 he was offered six-figure advance by Harper Collins to write a trilogy of children's novels. The first of these, The Palace of Laughter was shortlisted for the 2007 CBI Bisto award. Its sequel, The Tiger's Egg, was released in September 2007. The third and final book in the series, The Lightning Key, was released in January 2009. The series, illustrated by Brandon Dorman, is set in and around a sinister circus, and features such colourful characters as a 400-year-old girl, a talking tiger and a stately dowager who lives in a tree. It has been described by Angie Sage as 'a vivid journey of discovery.'

Berkeley's latest book, The Hidden Boy, was published in February 2010. It is the first in a new series about a young girl who wins 'the Holiday of a Lifetime'. She and her family are transported to a strange hidden world, only to find that there is no way back.
