= Berkeley High School =

Berkeley High School refers to the following high schools:

- Berkeley High School (California)
- Berkeley High School (Moncks Corner, South Carolina)
- Berkeley High School (Missouri)

== See also ==
- Berkley High School, Berkley, Michigan
