= Berkeley Square (1959 film) =

1959 TV film

- Hallmark Hall of Fame episode
- Directed by: George Schaefer
- Written by: Theodore Apstein
- Based on: play by John L. Balderstone
- Original air date: February 5, 1959
- Running time: 90 mins

Berkeley Square is a 1959 American TV film based on the play Berkeley Square by John L. Balderston. It was presented on the Hallmark Hall of Fame and directed by George Schaefer. It featured the first American television performance of Janet Munro who had just been signed to a contract by Disney.

== Plot ==
An American is transported from contemporary London to the 18th century.

== Cast ==
- John Kerr
- Jennie Carson
- John Colicos
- Edna Best
- Janet Munro
- Frances Reid

== Reception ==
The Los Angeles Times said "the cast was largely inept" except for Janet Munro.

Variety said it "sagged on TV under the weight of a heavy footed leag performance by John Kerr."
