= Berkeley Group =

Berkeley Group may refer to:

- Berkeley Group in Brazil, a group of economists carrying out research at IPEA in the 1960s under the leadership of Professors Howard S. Ellis and Albert Fishlow of the University of California. Their work is summarized in The Economy of Brazil edited by Howard S. Ellis and published by the University of California Press in 1969.
- Berkeley Group Holdings, a British housebuilding company based in Cobham, Surrey
- Berkeley Islands, also known as "Berkeley Group", located in Nunavut, Canada
