= George Berkeley (disambiguation) =

George Berkeley (1685–1753) was an Irish philosopher and Anglican bishop.

George Berkeley or Berkley may also refer to:

- George Berkeley, 8th Baron Berkeley (1601–1658), English nobleman
- George Berkeley, 1st Earl of Berkeley (1628–1698), English aristocrat
- George Berkeley (died 1746) (after 1680–1746), British member of parliament
- Sir George Cranfield Berkeley (1753–1818), naval officer and politician
- Sir George Berkeley (British Army officer) (1785–1857), British soldier and Conservative politician
- Grantley Berkeley (George Charles Grantley Fitzhardinge Berkeley, 1800–1881), writer and British member of parliament
- Sir George Berkley (engineer) (1821–1893), British civil engineer
- Sir George Berkeley (colonial administrator) (1819–1905), British colonial administrator
- George Fitz-Hardinge Berkeley (1870–1955), English cricketer
- George Monck Berkeley (1763–1793), English playwright and author
