= John Perrot =

Lord Deputy to Queen Elizabeth I (1528–1592)

Sir John Perrot
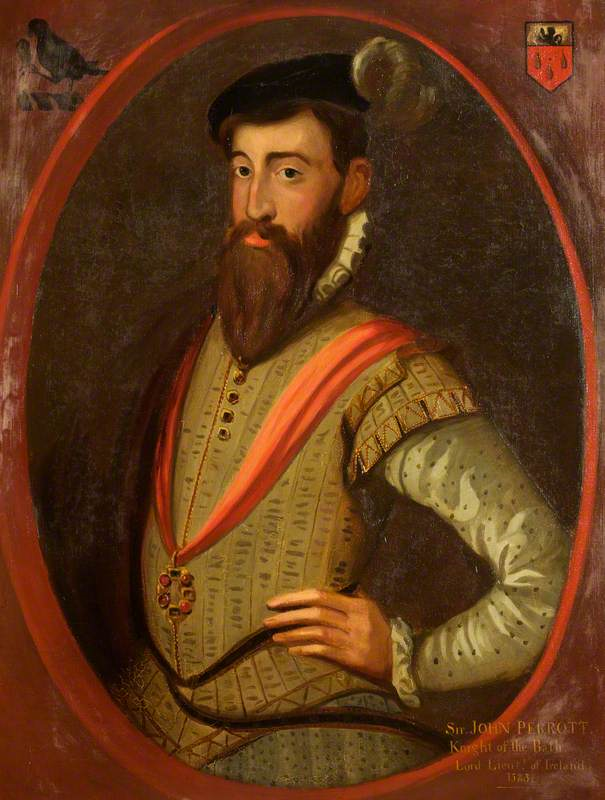
- Painting by George Powle
- Born: 7×11 November 1528
- Died: 3 November 1592; Tower of London
- Spouses: Anne Cheyne; Jane Prust
- Issue more...: Sir Thomas Perrot; Sir James Perrot
- Father: Thomas Perrot
- Mother: Mary Berkeley

Sir John Perrot (7 November 1528 – 3 November 1592) was a member of the Welsh gentry who served as Lord Deputy of Ireland under Queen Elizabeth I of England during the Tudor conquest of Ireland. It was formerly speculated that he was an illegitimate son of King Henry VIII, though the idea is rejected by modern historians.

Sir John Perrot, was a figure of unusual power and influence in Tudor Britain and Ireland. Born near Haverfordwest in 1528, he inherited wealth and power – the Perrots had been accumulating both in west Wales for centuries – and gained more ingratiating himself with the English court.

His own son described him as a "very cholericke" man, who "could not brooke any crosses". He had already gathered many offices by the time he was sent to Ireland in 1571 as President of Munster to suppress a rebellion. His methods were characteristically violent – he hanged over 800 of the rebels – but he resigned after two years, having failed in his mission.

Back in west Wales he contented himself with self-enrichment and self-glorification, rebuilding in grand style his two main homes, Carew Castle and Laugharne Castle. He returned to Ireland as 1584 as Lord Deputy, with the task of crushing the Irish and colonising their land. Again unsuccessful, he returned, was falsely accused of treason by his many enemies, and died in the Tower of London in 1592, possibly of poisoning.

== Early life ==
Perrot was born between 7 November and 11 November 1528, probably at the family seat of Haroldston Manor near Haverfordwest in Pembrokeshire in the south-west of Wales. He was the only son of Thomas Perrot (1504/05–1531) and Mary Berkeley (c.1511–c.1586), the daughter of James Berkeley (died c. 1515) of Thornbury, Gloucestershire. He had two sisters: Jane, who married Sir John Philipps, 1st Baronet of Picton Castle, and Elizabeth, who married John Price of Gogerddan. Perrot was educated, according to his own testimony, at the cathedral school in St Davids, on the western coastline of Pembrokeshire.

Perrot resembled Henry VIII in temperament and physical appearance, and it was widely believed that he was the bastard son of the late King. The main source for this belief was Sir Robert Naunton (husband of Perrot's granddaughter, Penelope), who had never known Perrot and used second-hand accounts to make his case. The case is weakened by the fact that Perrot was Mary Berkeley's third child, not her first, and that she and the King are not recorded to have been in the same place at the crucial time.

Naunton claimed Sir Owen Hopton, Lieutenant of the Tower of London, overheard Perrot say, "Will the Queen suffer her brother to be offered up as a sacrifice to the envy of his frisking adversaries?", suggesting that Perrot himself asserted his royal paternity. However, Hopton had been removed from office by the Queen eighteen months prior to Perrot's imprisonment, so he could not have overheard Perrot make the claim there.

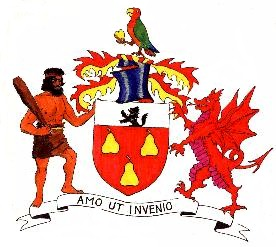
The Achievement in Arms of Sir John Perrot, redrawn by the P-rr-tt Society from the description in The General Armory: "Crest: A parrot vert holding in the dexter claw a pear or, leaved ppr. Supporters – Dexter, an Ancient Briton armed and blazoned ppr.; sinister, a dragon gu. Motto – Amo ut invenio [I love as I find]".

Perrot joined the household of William Paulet, 1st Marquess of Winchester, and thereby gained his introduction to Henry VIII. His advancement faltered on the death of the King in January 1547, but in the following month he was knighted at the coronation of Henry's successor, Edward VI.

In 1551, Perrot was appointed High Sheriff of Pembrokeshire, and in June of the same year he visited France in the train of William Parr, 1st Marquess of Northampton, who had been sent to arrange Edward VI's betrothal to Elisabeth of Valois, the young daughter of Henry II of France. Perrot's skill as a knight and in the hunt fascinated King Henry, who sought to retain him for reward. Perrot declined, but on his return to England his debts were paid by the French Crown.

During the reign of Mary I, Perrot suffered brief imprisonment in the Fleet with his uncle, Robert Perrot, on a charge of sheltering heretics at his house in Wales. Following his release, he declined to assist the Earl of Pembroke in seeking out heretics in south Wales, but in 1557 was content to serve the same Earl at the capture of Saint-Quentin in France.

Perrot inherited the castle and lordship of Carew. At the beginning of Elizabeth I's reign the naval defence of South Wales was entrusted to his care. His advancement continued in 1562, when he was elected Knight of Pembrokeshire. He served as member of parliament for Carmarthenshire in 1547, Sandwich in 1553 and 1555, Wareham in 1559 (presumably through pressure exerted on the Rogers family by the 2nd Earl of Bedford, his former commander), Pembrokeshire in 1563, and Haverfordwest in 1589.

== Munster ==
In 1570 Perrot reluctantly accepted the newly created post of Lord President of the Irish province of Munster, which was in the throes of the first of the Desmond Rebellions. He landed at Waterford in February of the following year and, in a vigorous and gruelling campaign, reduced the province to peace.

The chief rebel, Fitzmaurice, eluded government forces for some time. In one grisly incident, after fifty rebels had been slain, Perrot sought to awe his enemy by cutting off the heads of the corpses and fixing them to the market cross of Kilmallock. Fitzmaurice still refused to come in, and Perrot issued him with a challenge to single combat, which the rebel declined with the comment, "For if I should kill Sir John Perrot the Queen of England can send another president into this province; but if he do kill me there is none other to succeed me or to command as I do". Perrot's challenge provoked mutterings from the more level-headed servants of the Crown, and his reputation for rash judgment was confirmed when he was ambushed by the rebels, who outnumbered his force ten to one, only to be relieved when the rebels mistook a small cavalry company for the advance party of a larger Crown force. But in 1572, after a second and successful siege of the rebel stronghold of Castlemaine, he was vindicated on Fitzmaurice's submission.

During his presidency Perrot reported to the Privy Council that he had carried out the hanging of 800 rebels “by the Lawes of this Realme and also by the mershall lawe.” After the rebellion he criticised the Crown's reinstatement of Fitzmaurice's superior, the Earl of Desmond, as chief nobleman of Munster. He requested his own recall, but this was in vain and in July 1573 he quit Ireland without leave. Upon presenting himself at court he was permitted to resign his office, and was succeeded by Sir William Drury.

== Wales ==
Perrot returned to Carew in Wales, where he intended, "to lead a countryman's life and to keep out of debt". He was appointed vice-Admiral of the Welsh seas and member of the Council of the Marches, and served as Mayor of Haverfordwest (1575–77). In his personal estates, he converted several castles into mansions and improved his land, although there were continual complaints of his practice of rack-renting and enclosures.

In 1578 Perrot was accused by his deputy-Admiral, Richard Vaughan, of tyranny, subversion of justice, and dealing with pirates. The accusations may have been exaggerated, and Perrot retained the confidence of the Crown: in the same year he was appointed commissioner for piracy in Pembrokeshire, and in the following year was given command of a naval squadron charged with the interception of Spanish ships on the Irish coast. In 1579, during a voyage to Ireland, he chased a pirate ship to the Flemish coast and captured the commander, Deryfold. On her approach to the Thames estuary Perrot's ship was struck by a storm, and while all on board prepared for death Perrot said to his son, Thomas, "Well Boy, God bless you and I give you my blessing. I wish to God that you were ashore and the Queen's ship safe then I should care the less about myself". The ship was saved with the skill of the captive Deryfold, who was pardoned by the Queen on Perrot's petition.

In 1583, Perrot's son Thomas was married to Dorothy Devereux (daughter of Walter Devereux, 1st Earl of Essex, and step-daughter of the great royal favourite Robert Dudley, 1st Earl of Leicester). The match was no doubt intended to strengthen Perrot politically, but it had precisely the opposite effect: the Queen, whose consent to the marriage had not been sought, took grave offence, suspecting a conspiracy between Perrot and Leicester's wife, Lettice Knollys, whom she detested.

== Lord Deputy of Ireland ==
In 1584 Perrot was appointed Lord Deputy of Ireland, to replace Lord Grey de Wilton who had been recalled to England by the Queen two years earlier. His chief task was to establish the plantation of the southern province of Munster, a significant escalation of colonial policy. The Crown sought to parcel out lands at nominal rents from the confiscated estates of the lately defeated Earl of Desmond – some 600,000 acres (2,400 km^{2}) – on condition that the undertakers plant English farmers and labourers to build towns and work the land.

Before he had time to begin in the south, Perrot got wind of raids into the northern province of Ulster by the Scottish clans Maclean and MacDonald in alliance with Somhairle Buidhe Mac Domhnaill. Perrot marched a contingent of the Royal Irish Army north from the Pale to confront the Scots, but Sorley Boy evaded them by retreating to Scotland, only to return later with reinforcements. Elizabeth roundly abused her deputy for launching such an expensive and unadvised campaign, but by 1586 Perrot had brought Sorley Boy to a mutually beneficial submission. At about this time Perrot also sanctioned the kidnapping at Rathmullan of Hugh Roe O'Donnell, Tanist to the Chief of the Name of Clan O'Donnell, (who was lured to a wine tasting on a merchant ship anchored in Lough Swilly and then sealed in a cabin and brought to imprisonment in Dublin Castle), a move which gave the crown some leverage over the Irish clans of County Donegal. Perrot's northern strategy also secured the submission of Hugh Maguire, Lord of Fermanagh.

The plantation of Munster got off to a slow start in the face of lawsuits brought by landowners associated with the Geraldine rebels. In the west, Perrot did have success in 1585 by perfecting a composition of the province of Connaught, an unusually even-handed contract between the Crown and landowners by which the Queen received certain rents in return for settling land titles and tenant dues. In the same year a parliament was convened at Dublin, the first since 1569, with great hopes expressed upon the attendance of the Gaelic lords. The sessions proved a disappointment: although the act for the attainder of Desmond (clearing the escheat of the rebel's estates to the Crown) was passed, the ambitious schedule of legislation ran into difficulty, particularly over the suspension of Poynings' Law. At the prorogation in 1587, Perrot was so frustrated with the influence of factions within both houses of parliament (orchestrated to a large degree by the Earl of Ormond) that he begged to be recalled to England.

Perrot's unsparing criticism of his associates in government made him numerous enemies. His plan for the conversion of the revenues of St. Patrick's Cathedral to fund two colleges led to a sustained quarrel with the Archbishop of Dublin, Adam Loftus, whom Perrot wilfully aggravated by his interference with the prelate's secular authority as Lord Chancellor. He also interfered with Bingham's government of Connaught; caused the council secretary Sir Geoffrey Fenton to be imprisoned for debt; and in May 1587 was accused of striking the elderly Knight Marshal, Sir Nicholas Bagenal, in the council chamber, an incident his enemies blamed on his drunkenness. In January 1588 Elizabeth granted Perrot's request for recall. Six months later, at the height of the Armada emergency, he was succeeded by Sir William Fitzwilliam.

== Ruin ==
Upon Perrot's return to England, he was elected member of parliament in 1589 for Haverfordwest and appointed to the Privy Council, where he maintained his interest in Irish affairs through correspondence with several members of the council in Dublin. However his enemies were working against him. In the heated politics following the defeat of the Spanish Armada he was accused of treason, based on allegations made in Ireland by a former priest and condemned prisoner, Sir Dennis O'Roghan. The evidence was provided in letters allegedly addressed by Perrot as Lord Deputy (with his signature attached) to King Philip II of Spain and the Duke of Parma, in which certain treasonable promises were made on the future dominion of England, Wales and Ireland.

Fitzwilliam started an investigation into the charges in Dublin, but O'Roghan's record of forging documents was quickly produced, and for a time it seemed the allegations would fail for lack of credible evidence. Rather than let the matter lie, it was decided (perhaps at Perrot's urging) to inquire into the manner in which the allegations had been raised in the first place, a procedure likely to embarrass Fitzwilliam. The inquiry was held in Dublin by a commission that included several of Perrot's favourites on the Dublin council: Nicholas White (Master of the Rolls in Ireland), Charles Calthorpe (Attorney General), and Nicholas Walsh (former Speaker of the House of Commons).

O'Roghan alleged that he had been tortured by members of this commission, and Fitzwilliam was instantly directed on strict instruction from the Queen to resume his original investigation and forward the findings to the Privy Council in London. Perrot faced a moment of crisis when further allegations were made – most notably by his former secretary, Henry Bird – of his frequent use in private conversation of violent language against the Queen. He was also accused of having prior knowledge of the rebellion in 1589 of Sir Brian O'Rourke (later extradited from Scotland and hanged at London), which had occurred under the government of Bingham in Connaught.

Perrot ended up in the Tower of London and in 1592 stood trial before a special commission on charges of high treason. O'Roghan's letters and the evidence concerning the O'Rourke rebellion played their part in the prosecution case, but the evidence most vividly presented was of Perrot's remarks about Queen Elizabeth: "God's wounds, this it is to serve a base bastard pissing kitchen woman, if I had served any prince in Christendom I have not been so dealt withal." Further evidence showed he had disparaged her legitimacy on several occasions. Perrot protested his loyalty and, in reaction to a hectoring prosecution counsel, eloquently cried out, "You win men's lives away with words". But his defence descended into blustering, and the jury returned a verdict of guilty. Sentencing was put off for some months in the hope of a royal pardon, but Perrot died in the Tower in September that year. Whether Elizabeth actually intended to pardon him is uncertain, although there are grounds to believe he was poisoned in anticipation of his release from custody.

Following Perrot's imprisonment, some of his Irish favourites had been replaced in their council seats by English appointees, who fully equated Protestantism with the state and were inclined towards total war against Gaelic Ireland. Fitzwilliam felt free to pursue a policy opposed in crucial aspects to Perrot's, and the Irish clan chiefs of Ulster (including Hugh O'Neill) suffered increasing evictions of their clansmen and Protestant Plantation upon their territories, which helped trigger the outbreak of the Nine Years' War (1595–1603).

== Marriages and issue ==
Perrot married firstly Anne Cheyne (d.1553) (daughter of Sir Thomas Cheyne by his first wife, Frideswide Frowyk, daughter of Sir Thomas Frowyk), by whom he had a son and heir, Sir Thomas Perrot (d.1594).

After the death of his first wife, Perrot remained unmarried for a decade. In 1563 or 1564 he married Jane Prust (d.1593), widow of Lewis Pollard (d.1563) of Oakford, Devon, and daughter of Hugh Prust (d.1559) of Thorry, Devonshire. She had a son and two daughters by Perrot:

- William Perrot (d.1587), who died unmarried.
- Anne Perrott, who married Sir John Philipps, 1st Baronet, of Picton Castle, ancestor of the Viscount St Davids.
- Lettice, who married firstly Walter Vaughan of Golden Grove, Carmarthenshire, secondly John Langhorne of St Brides, and thirdly, on 8 April 1605, Arthur Chichester, Baron Chichester of Belfast and eventually Lord Deputy of Ireland.

On appointment as Lord Deputy of Ireland, Perrot had made a deed of settlement entailing his estates on his sons and their male descendants, and in default on his cousin Thomas Perrott of Broke Co. Carmarthen. The settlement may have been a precaution against the hazards of office in Ireland.

Perrot's first son, Thomas, was imprisoned after his marriage to Dorothy Devereux, and she was banished from Court. In March 1593, four months after Perrot's death, Thomas was restored in blood. Dorothy was not restored to favour until after her husband's death in 1594.

Perrot fathered at least four illegitimate children, Sir James Perrot, John Perrot (born c.1565), Elizabeth Perrot, and another daughter whose name is unknown. Sir James Perrot authored the manuscript The life, deedes and death of Sir John Perrott, knight, published in 1728. John Perrot's name appears in the Inner Temple Register in an entry dated 5 June 1583: "John Perot, of Haryve, Co. Pembroke, 3rd son of John Perot, Knight". Elizabeth, who married Hugh Butler of Pembroke, was the granddaughter of Sir Christopher Hatton, a favourite of Elizabeth I and enemy of Sir John (the source of their hostility being Sir John's relationship with Sir Christopher's unmarried illegitimate daughter, also named Elizabeth).

== Notes ==
Preceded by Thomas Cathern	Custos Rotulorum of Pembrokeshire bef. 1562–1592	Succeeded by The Earl of Essex
Preceded by Lord Grey de Wilton	Lord Deputy of Ireland; 1584–1588	Succeeded by William Fitzwilliam
