= Berkeley Square, Trenton =

Populated place in Mercer County, New Jersey, US

Berkeley Square
- Neighborhood of Trenton
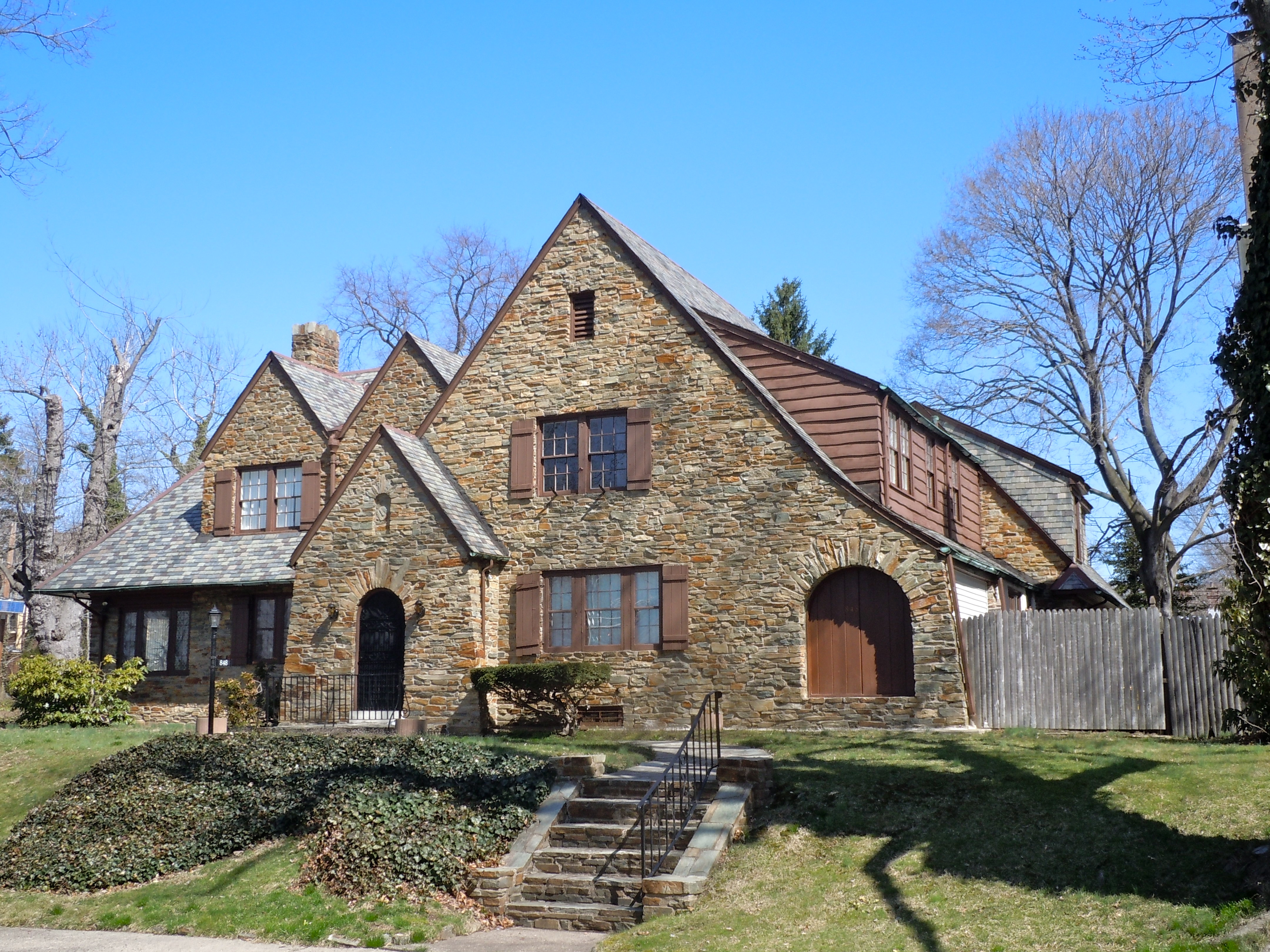
- Home in Berkeley Square

- Location of Berkeley Square in Mercer County Inset: Location of county within the state of New Jersey
- Coordinates: 40°13′51″N 74°47′19″W
- Country: United States
- State: New Jersey
- County: Mercer
- City: Trenton

- Berkeley Square Historic District
- U.S. National Register of Historic Places
- U.S. Historic district
- NRHP reference No.: 80002499
- Added to NRHP: November 20, 1980

Berkeley Square, also known as Cadwalader Place, is a neighborhood located within the city of Trenton in Mercer County, in the U.S. state of New Jersey. It is primarily a residential neighborhood consisting of detached, single-family homes constructed in the late 19th century and early 20th century. As an extremely early example of suburbia, it was listed on the National Register of Historic Places in 1980.
