= Haroldston St. Issell's =

Village in Pembrokeshire, Wales

Coordinates: 51.79°N 4.98°W

Haroldston St Issells
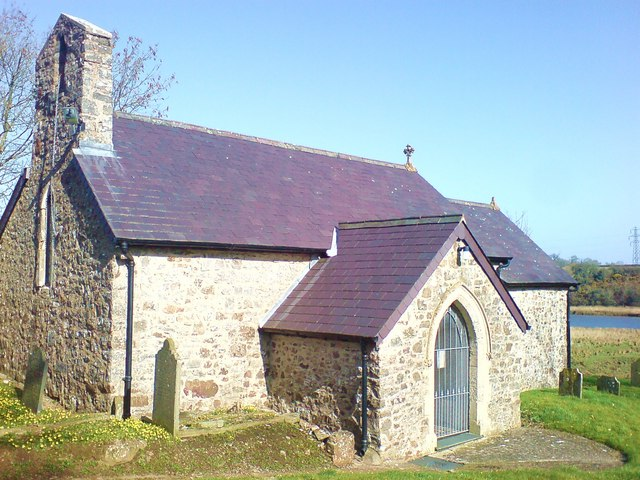
- St Issell's Church, Haroldston

- Location within Pembrokeshire
- Population: 1,103
- OS grid reference: SM945144
- Principal area: Pembrokeshire
- Preserved county: Dyfed
- Country: Wales
- Sovereign state: United Kingdom
- Post town: HAVERFORDWEST
- Postcode district: SA61
- Dialling code: 01437
- Police: Dyfed-Powys
- Fire: Mid and West Wales
- Ambulance: Welsh
- UK Parliament: Preseli Pembrokeshire

Haroldston St Issells is a former parish in Pembrokeshire, Wales, on the upper reaches of the Western Cleddau, 1 mile (1.6 km) southeast of Haverfordwest. Its area is 1,104 acres (447 ha); Haroldston church is co-located with Lower Haroldston and is a small attractive building. Haroldston ruins and Lower Haroldston can both be viewed from a circular walk along the banks of the Cleddau. Haroldston and other places in the parish are preserved as historic place names by the Royal Commission.

== History ==
=== Manor ===
Haroldston Manor was the seat of firstly the Harold family and then the Perrot family, including Sir John Perrot, thought to be the illegitimate son of Henry VIII. It appears (as Harroldston) on a 1578 parish map of Pembrokeshire. Upper and Lower Haroldston are two ancient farmhouses that were probably part of the Haroldston estate. Lower Haroldston is still a working farm, whilst Upper Haroldston is a domestic dwelling. Haroldstone House, described by Coflein as "once one of the grandest houses in the county of Pembrokeshire" is now a ruin, but its origins are medieval, going back at least to the 12th century. The remnants of the gardens and grounds are designated Grade II on the Cadw/ICOMOS Register of Parks and Gardens of Special Historic Interest in Wales.

In 1643, Haroldston was garrisoned by Royalist troops with the presumed support of Herbert Perrot. The following year he changed sides, risking the destruction of his property, but the King's cause faltered. By the restoration, he had changed sides again and was knighted.

=== Population ===
The population of the parish reported in 1833 was 304. In 1872, it was reported as 281, in 59 houses.

=== Mining ===
Ochre was mined at Greenhill Ochre Mine to the south south east of Merlins Bridge from 1911 until about 1915, then abandoned by 1919. In 1994 it was excavated to bedrock level for capping to safeguard Haverfordwest building expansion.

=== Records ===
The records of Haroldston, St Issell and Hamlet of St Thomas Parish Council are held by Pembrokeshire Archives and Local Studies. Dyfed Family History Society is the repository for the records of the parish church.
