= Barkley (surname) =

Barkley is an English surname. Notable people with the surname include:

== Sports ==
- Brian Barkley (born 1975), American baseball pitcher
- Charles Barkley (born 1963), American basketball player
- David Barkley (born 1950), Australian Rules football player
- Doug Barkley (born 1937), Canadian ice hockey defenceman and head coach
- Erick Barkley (born 1978), American basketball player
- Iran Barkley (born 1960), American boxer
- Jeff Barkley (born 1959), American baseball pitcher
- Matt Barkley (born 1990), American football quarterback who plays in the National Football League
- Noel Barkley (born 1961), footballer who represented New Zealand internationally
- Olly Barkley (born 1981), English rugby player
- Red Barkley (1912–2000), American baseball infielder
- Ross Barkley (born 1993), English footballer
- Sam Barkley (1858–1912), American baseball second baseman
- Saquon Barkley (born 1997), American football player

== Politics ==
- Alben W. Barkley (1877–1956), 35th Vice President of the United States
- Alexander Barkley (1817–1893), American politician from New York
- Charles E. Barkley (born 1950), American politician from Maryland
- Dean Barkley (born 1950), Senator from Minnesota
- Jane Hadley Barkley (1911–1964), Second Lady of the United States, wife of Alben W. Barkley
- Margaret Barkley, member of the Ohio House of Representatives
- Richard Clark Barkley (1932–2015), American diplomat

== Military ==
- David B. Barkley (1899–1918), American soldier during the First World War
- John L. Barkley (1895–1966), American soldier during the First World War

== Arts and entertainment ==
- Brad Barkley, American writer
- James Barkley, American artist
- Lucille Barkley (1925–1979), American actress
- Roger Barkley (1936–1997), American radio personality

== Other ==
- Charles William Barkley (1759–1832), English ship's captain and fur trader
- Frances Barkley, wife of Charles William Barkley, first woman to sail around the world without deception
- Fred Alexander Barkley (1908–1989), American botanist
- Russell Barkley (born 1949), doctor of clinical psychology and ADHD researcher

== See also ==
- Charles Barkley (disambiguation)
- Barkley (disambiguation)
- The Big Valley
