= Barclay =

Barclay may refer to:

== People ==
- Barclay (surname)
- Clan Barclay
- Sophia Barclay

== Places ==
- Barclay, Kansas
- Barclay, Maryland, a town in Queen Anne's County
- Barclay, Baltimore, Maryland, a neighborhood
- Barclay, Nevada, a town in Lincoln County
- Barclay, Texas
- Barclays Center, a sports venue in Brooklyn, New York
- Barclay Theatre, a performing arts center in Irvine, California

== Business ==
- Barclay (record label), a French record label
- Barclay (cigarette), an American brand of cigarettes
- Barclays, a United Kingdom-based bank
- Barclay Manufacturing Company (1922–1971), a toy manufacturer
- Barclay Mowlem, former Australian construction company
- Andrew Barclay Sons & Company, a Scottish locomotive builder
- Jack Barclay Bentley, a Bentley dealership
- Barclay, a brand of liquor owned by Barton Brands

== Education ==
- The Barclay School, a secondary school in Stevenage, UK
- Barclay College, a college in Haviland, Kansas

== Other uses ==
- Operation Barclay, a World War II operation
- The Barclays, A golf tournament in New York City area

== See also ==
- Barclay Hotel
- Barclayville, the capital of Grand Kru County, Liberia
- Barkley (disambiguation)
- Berkeley (disambiguation)
