= Cellular floor raceways =

Electrical wiring ducts or cells made from steel

Cellular floor raceways are electrical wiring ducts or cells made from steel floor deck that serve as structural formwork for placement of concrete floor slabs and also as wire and cable raceways within the concrete floor slab.

These raceway systems are generally used to create floor slabs on multi-story steel-framed buildings but can also be used in concrete framed structures and for on-grade applications.
