= Spera SF =

Apartment complex located in San Francisco, California, United States

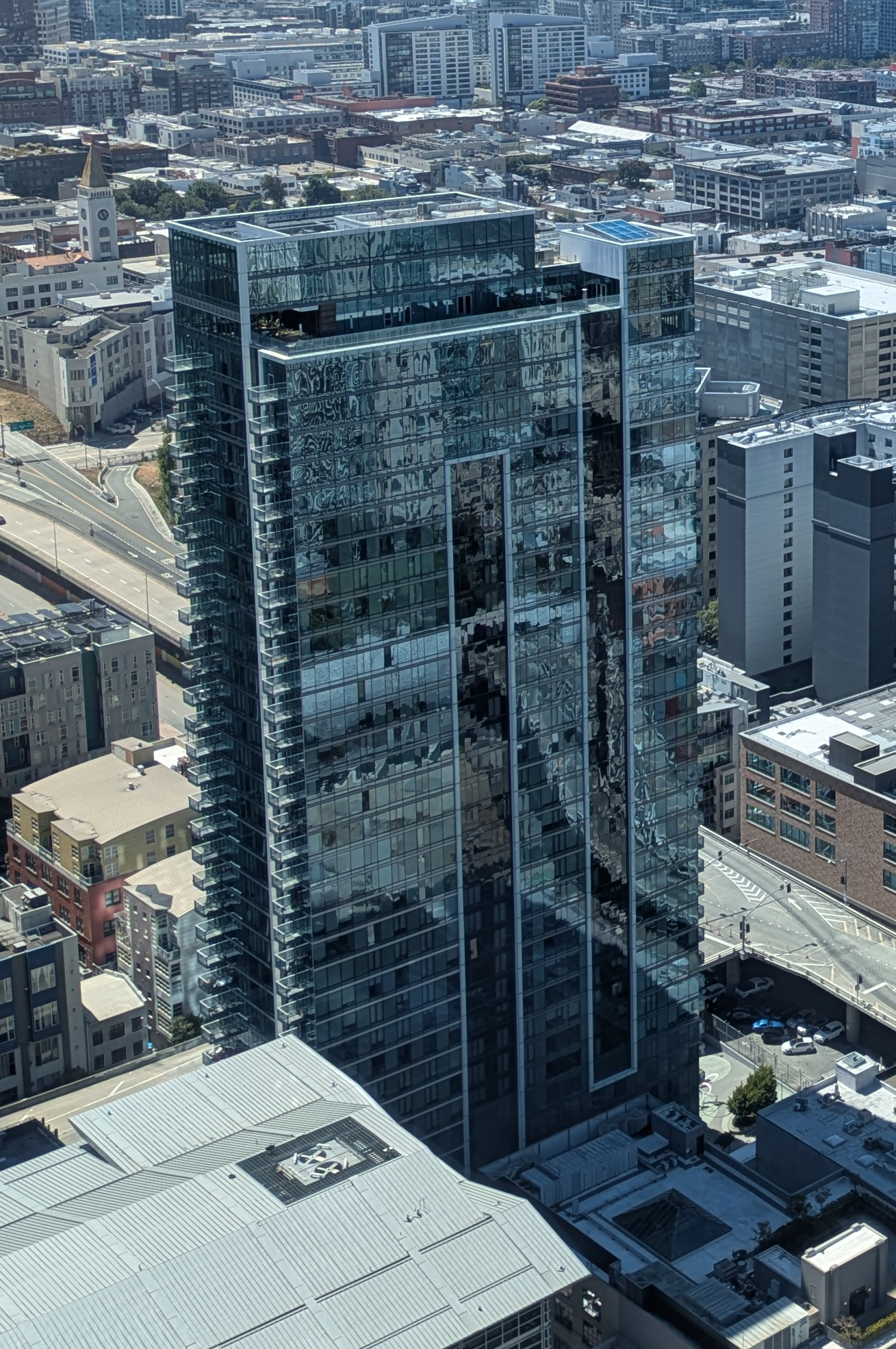
- From Salesforce Tower in 2025

- Location within San Francisco
- Former names: 33 Tehama

General information
- Type: Residential apartments
- Location: 39 Tehama Street; San Francisco, California
- Coordinates: 37.7873°N 122.3962°W
- Construction started: 2015
- Completed: 2017
- Owner: Hines Interests Limited Partnership

Height
- Architectural: 380 ft (120 m)
- Roof: 360 ft (110 m)

Technical details
- Floor count: 35
- Floor area: 278,097 square feet (25,836.1 m^{2})

Design and construction
- Architect: Arquitectonica
- Developer: Hines Interests Limited Partnership; Invesco
- Main contractor: Lendlease

Other information
- Number of units: 403

Spera SF, formerly known as 33 Tehama, is a luxury residential apartment complex in the South of Market neighborhood of San Francisco. The building is part of the San Francisco Transbay development area around the Salesforce Transit Center. The 35-story complex is 380 feet (120 m) tall, consists of 403 residential units, and offers 700 square feet of ground floor retail space.

== History ==
Hines Interests Limited Partnership and Invesco purchased the site at 41 Tehama Street in 2014. Lendlease was chosen as the general contractor and began construction in 2015. A construction malfunction of the climbing formwork occurred in early 2017, prompting precautionary evacuations of nearby buildings. Construction was completed in 2017 and opened to residents in 2018 as 33 Tehama.

It included an art installation designed by Yayoi Kusama, however the installation was destroyed in 2021 following an incident involving a vehicular crash into the property.

The building was closed to all tenants due to flooding on June 3, 2022. City records report the flood damaged 95 units and caused damage to elevators, the fire alarm system, and electrical systems, with some stairwells and hallways needing to be completely stripped. Flooding occurred again on August 10, 2022, damaging an additional 22 units.

Residents filed a lawsuit alleging Hines of improper maintenance, a negligent response to the disaster, breaching lease contracts, and theft of tenant property by the repair contractors. Hines rebuked the claims, stating that they paid approximately $13 million in accommodations, parking, and other tenant expenses related to the flooding.

The complex reopened to tenants under its current name in 2024. The rebrand included a change to the building's address to 39 Tehama Street.
