= Peikko Group =

Peikko Group Corporation
- Type: Limited company
- Industry: Manufacturing
- Founded: 1965 Teräspeikko (Lahti, Finland)
- Founder: Jalo Paananen
- Headquarters: Lahti, Finland
- Area served: Worldwide
- Key people: Philippe Jost (Chairman); Topi Paananen (CEO)
- Products: Slim Floor Structures, connections for concrete construction
- Revenue: 240 M € (2021)
- Number of employees: Over 2,000
- Subsidiaries: Over 30 subsidiaries worldwide
- Website: www.peikko.com

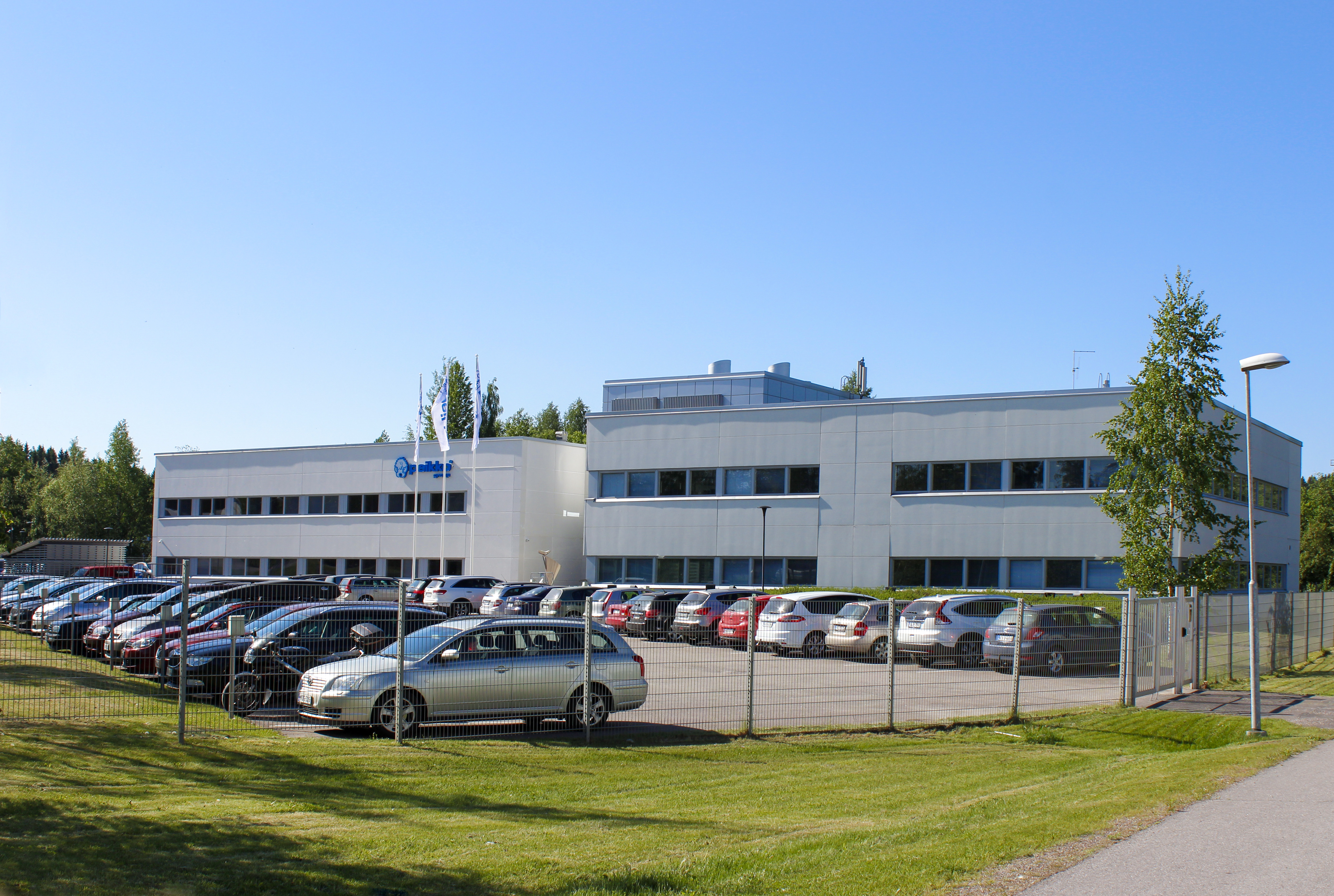
Peikko Group's Headquarter in Lahti, Finland

Peikko Group Corporation is a Finnish supplier of Slim Floor Structures, Wind Energy Applications and Connection Technology for Precast and Cast-in-situ. Peikko is a family-owned and run company with over 2,000 employees. Peikko was founded in 1965 and is headquartered in Lahti, Finland.

Peikko has subsidiaries in over 30 countries in Asia-Pacific, Europe, Africa, the Middle East and North America, with certified manufacturing operations in 12 countries. Peikko's turnover in 2021 is EUR 240 million.

== Products ==
Peikko's product range consists of concrete connections for precast construction, concrete connections for cast-in-situ construction, composite beams and frame structures enabling slim floor structures, flooring products, and wind turbine foundation technology.

== History ==
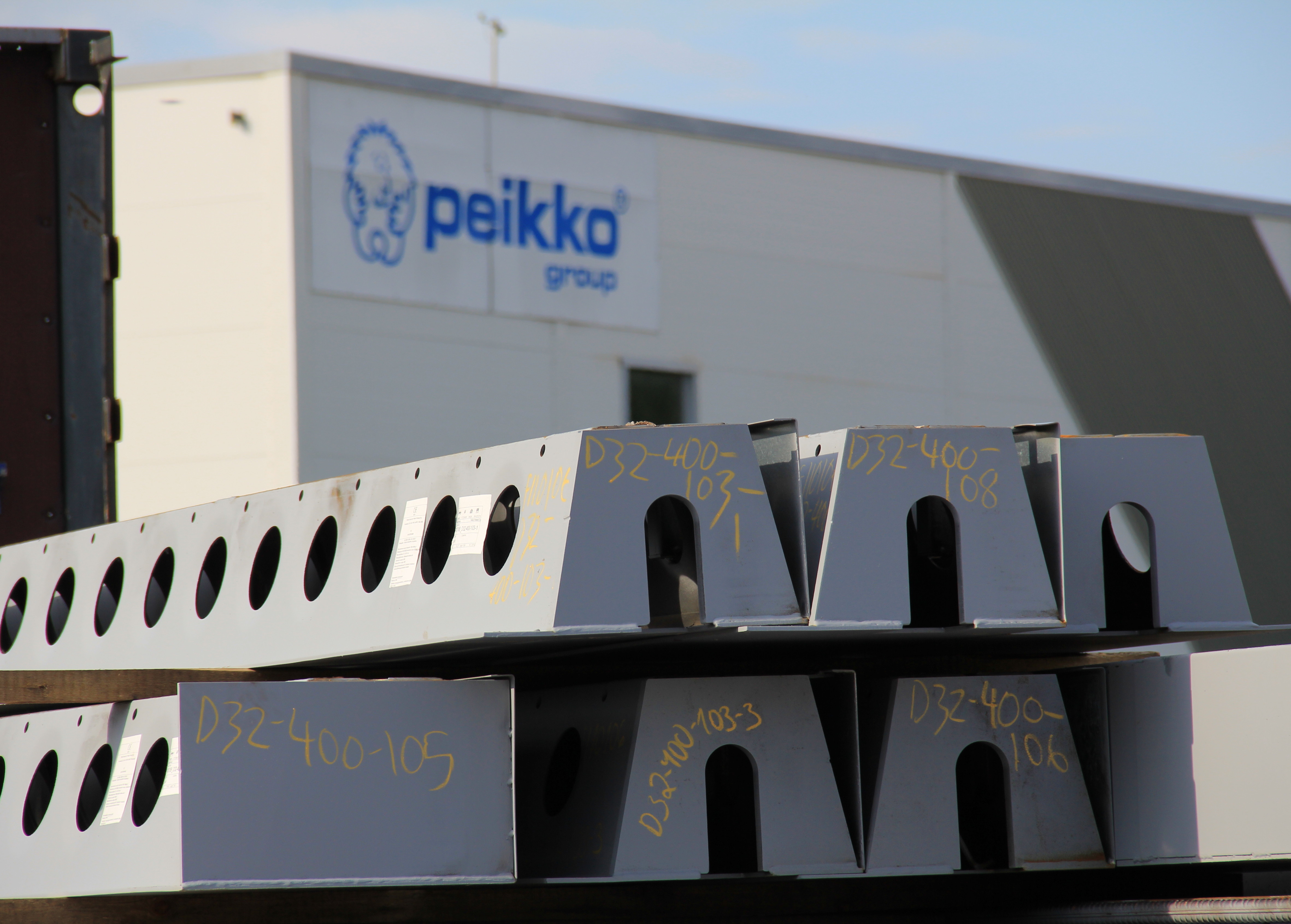
Composite beams

Founded in Finland, Northern Europe, in 1965 by Mr. Jalo Paananen under the name Teräspeikko. The company is now owned and managed by the second and third generation of the family. Peikko's first product was a diagonal tie used in sandwich wall elements. Even today the product is a part of Peikko's product portfolio.

The first steps of internationalization were taken in 1990's when establishing sales offices to Germany (1997), Norway (1999) and Sweden (2001). Today Peikko operates in over 30 countries worldwide.

The original name of the company "Teräspeikko" means Steel Troll in English. It resembles a Finnish, humorous view of a troll (peikko), a creature very common in Finnish fairy tales, living in forests. The company name was shortened to Peikko in 2005 due to the increase in international operations

== Sources ==
- peikko.com
- Peikko in Brief
