= Barkley =

Barkley may refer to:

== People ==
- Barkley (surname), people with this name

== Places ==
- Barkley, Delaware, an unincorporated community in New Castle County, Delaware, United States
- Barkley Township, Jasper County, Indiana, in the United States
- Barkley, Missouri, an unincorporated community
- Barkley Valley, British Columbia, former gold-mining community and ghost town
- Lake Barkley, a large man-made lake in the Western region of the U.S. State of Kentucky and named for Vice-President and Kentucky native Alben Barkley

== Other uses ==
- Barkley Shut Up and Jam!, a 1993 video game
- Barkley Inc., a U.S. advertising company
- Barkley Marathons, an ultramarathon race in Tennessee
- Barkley (Sesame Street), a dog character on Sesame Street
- Gnarls Barkley, an American musical collaboration started in 2003
- The Barkleys, an American animated television series that ran from 1972 to 1973

== See also ==
- Barclay (disambiguation)
- Barkly (disambiguation)
- Berkeley (disambiguation)
- Berkley (disambiguation)
- Berklee College of Music
