= Formwork =

Molds for cast

Animation depicting construction of multi-story building using aluminum handset formwork.

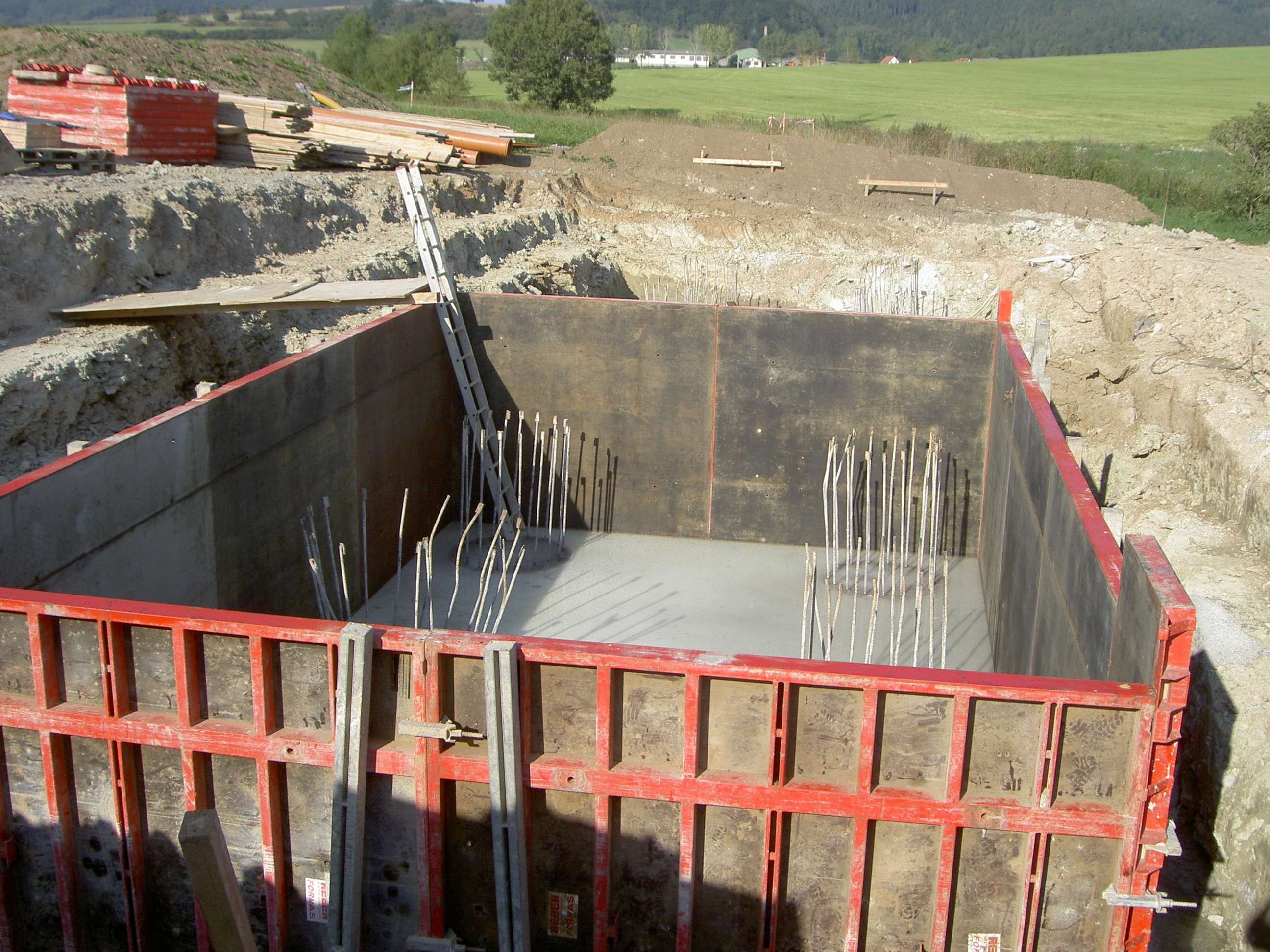
Modular steel frame formwork for a foundation. Rebar has been stubbed up out of the concrete slab to form the base of future columns

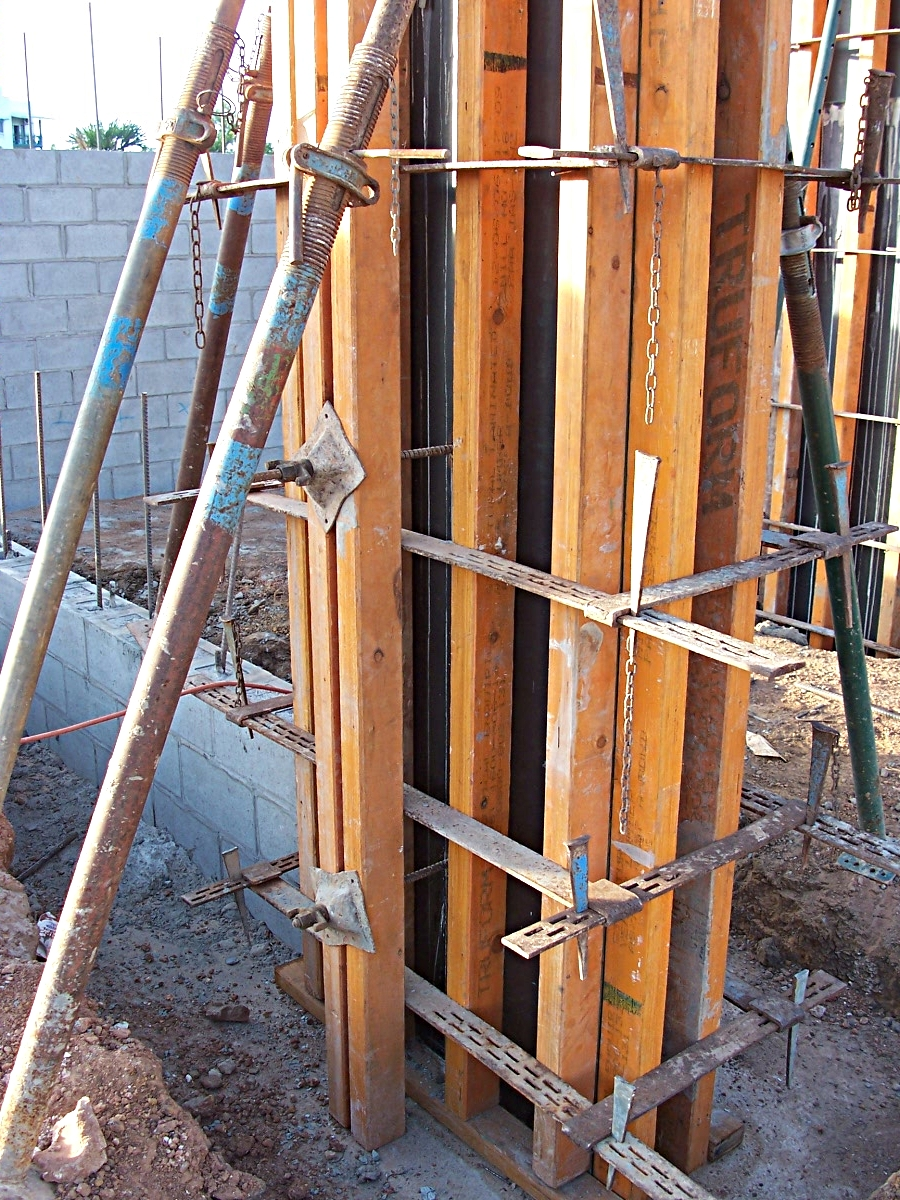
Timber formwork for a concrete column. Adjustable metal screw jacks both stabilize and plumb the form

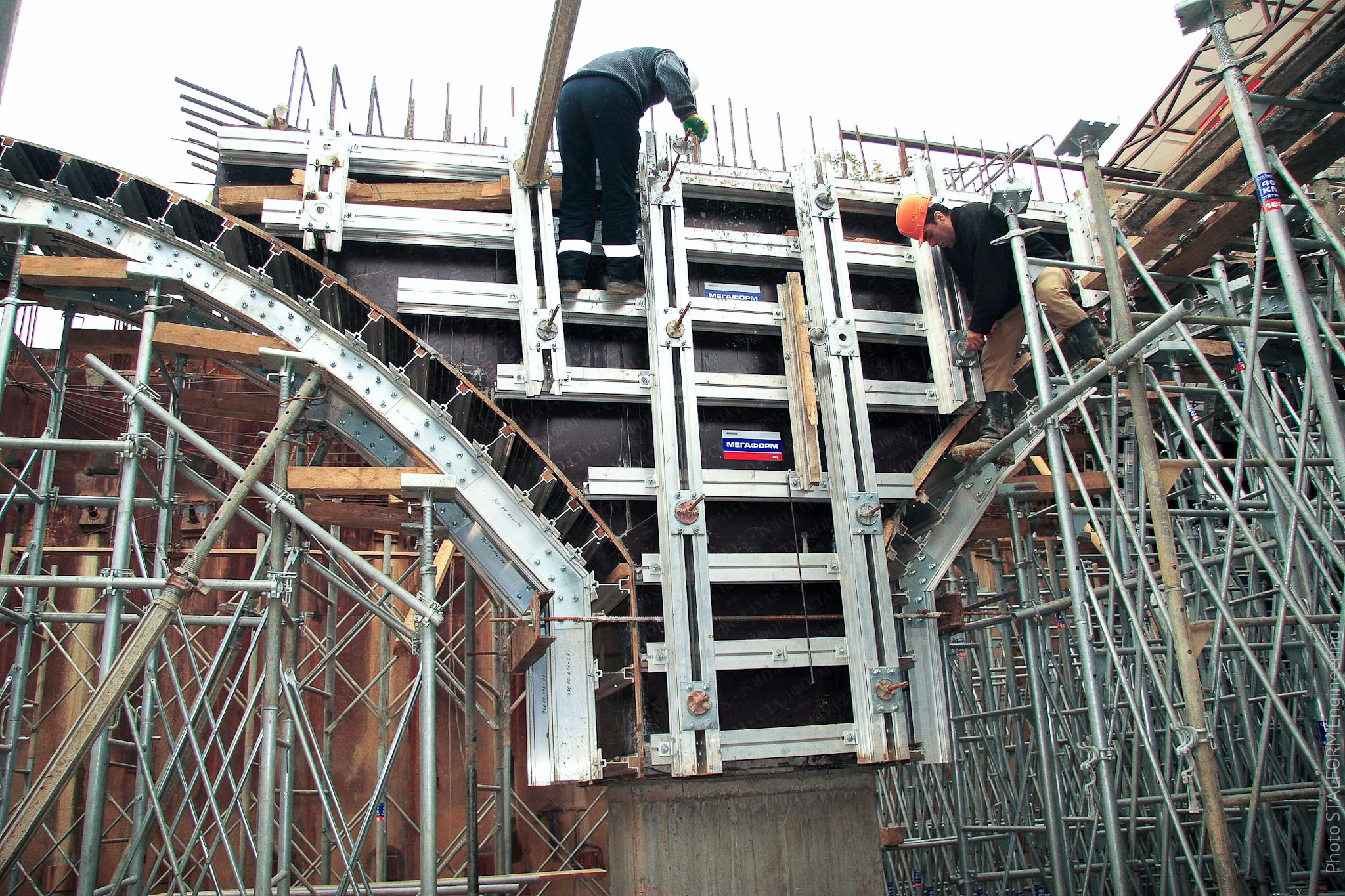
Aluminum formwork system

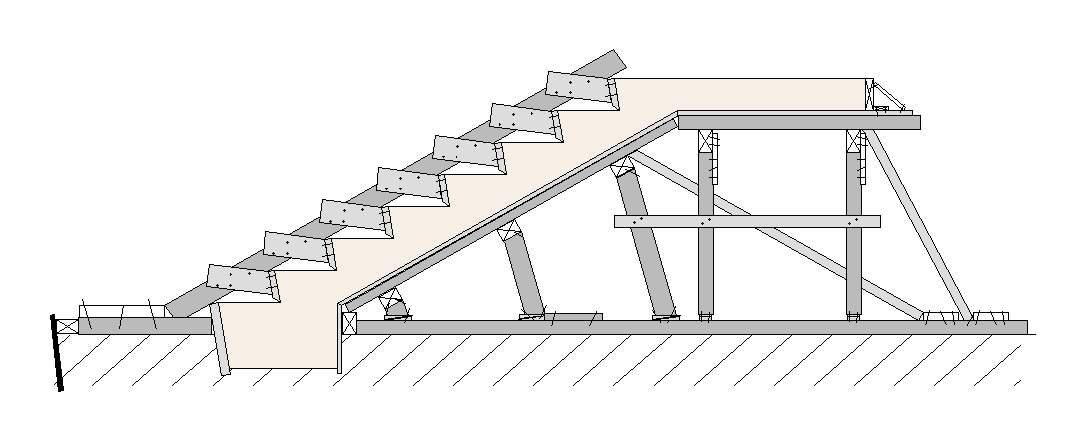
Sketch of the side view of traditional timber formwork used to form a flight of stairs

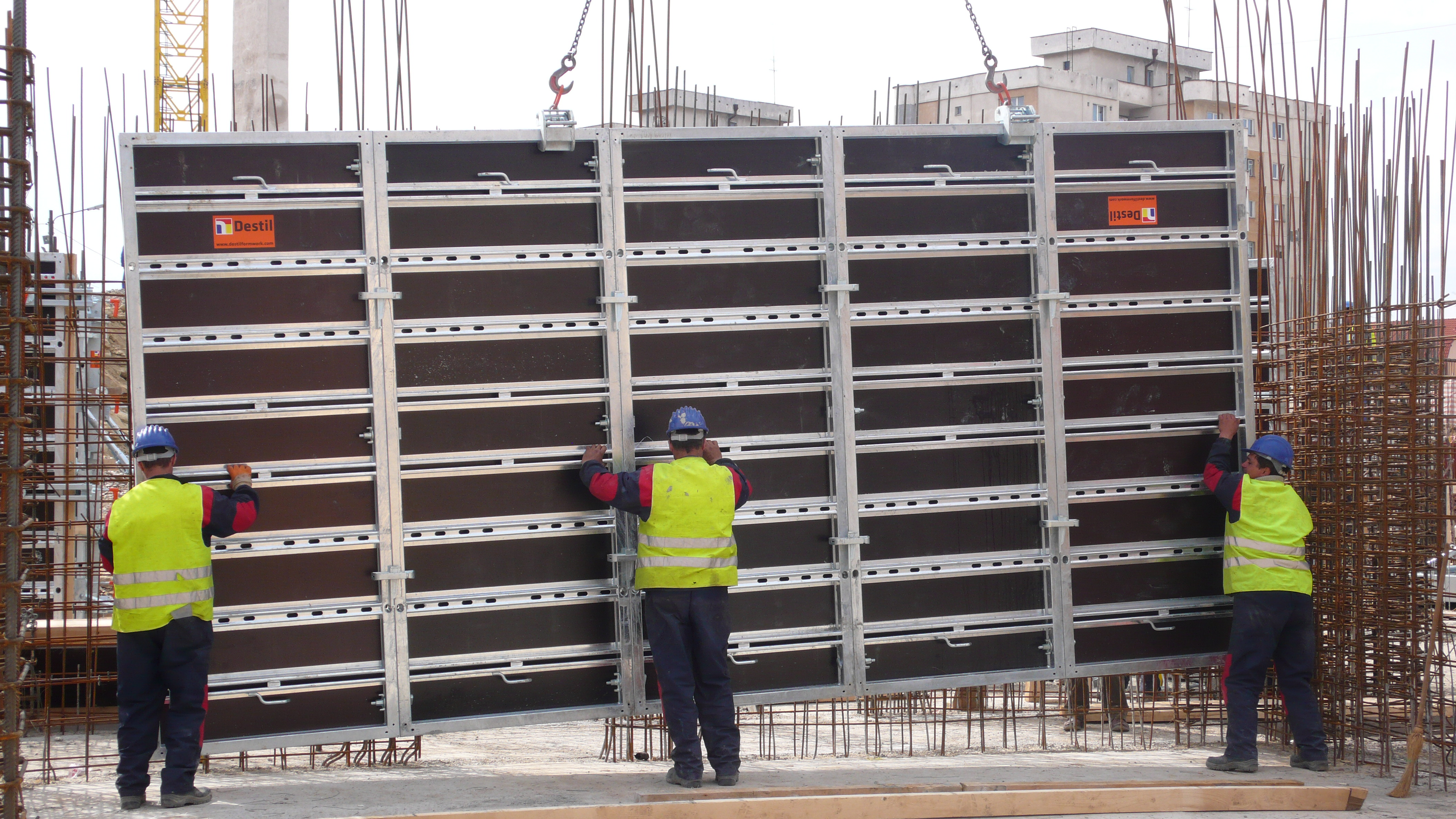
Placing a wall form. A matching form will be placed on the opposite side to create the space to pour concrete into

Formwork is molds into which concrete or similar materials are either precast or cast-in-place. In the context of concrete construction, the falsework supports the shuttering molds. In specialty applications formwork may be permanently incorporated into the final structure, adding insulation or helping reinforce the finished structure.

== Types ==
Formwork may be made of wood, metal, plastic, or composite materials:

1. Traditional timber formwork. The formwork is built on site out of timber and plywood or moisture-resistant particleboard. It is easy to produce but time-consuming for larger structures, and the plywood facing has a relatively short lifespan. It is still used extensively where the labour costs are lower than the costs for procuring reusable formwork. It is also the most flexible type of formwork, so even where other systems are in use, complicated sections may use it.
2. Engineered Formwork System. This formwork is built out of prefabricated modules with a metal frame (usually steel or aluminium) and covered on the application (concrete) side with material having the wanted surface structure (steel, aluminum, timber, etc.). The two major advantages of formwork systems, compared to traditional timber formwork, are speed of construction (modular systems pin, clip, or screw together quickly) and lower life-cycle costs (barring major force, the frame is almost indestructible, while the covering if made of wood; may have to be replaced after a few - or a few dozen - uses, but if the covering is made with steel or aluminium the form can achieve up to two thousand uses depending on care and the applications). Metal formwork systems are better protected against rot and fire than traditional timber formwork.
3. Re-usable plastic formwork. These interlocking and modular systems are used to build widely variable, but relatively simple, concrete structures. The panels are lightweight and very robust. They are especially suited for similar structure projects and low-cost, mass housing schemes. To get an added layer of protection against destructive weather, galvanized roofs will help by eliminating the risk of corrosion and rust. These types of modular enclosures can have load-bearing roofs to maximize space by stacking on top of one another. They can either be mounted on an existing roof, or constructed without a floor and lifted onto existing enclosures using a crane.
4. Permanent Insulated Formwork. This formwork is assembled on site, usually out of insulating concrete forms (ICF). The formwork stays in place after the concrete has cured, and may provide advantages in terms of speed, strength, superior thermal and acoustic insulation, space to run utilities within the EPS layer, and integrated furring strip for cladding finishes.
5. Stay-In-Place structural formwork systems. This formwork is assembled on site, usually out of prefabricated fiber-reinforced plastic forms. These are in the shape of hollow tubes, and are usually used for columns and piers. The formwork stays in place after the concrete has cured and acts as axial and shear reinforcement, as well as serving to confine the concrete and prevent against environmental effects, such as corrosion and freeze-thaw cycles.
6. Flexible formwork. In contrast to the rigid moulds described above, flexible formwork is a system that uses lightweight, high strength sheets of fabric to take advantage of the fluidity of concrete and create highly optimised, architecturally interesting, building forms. Using flexible formwork it is possible to cast optimised structures that use significantly less concrete than an equivalent strength prismatic section, thereby offering the potential for significant embodied energy savings in new concrete structures.

== Slab formwork (deck formwork) ==
Pantheon dome

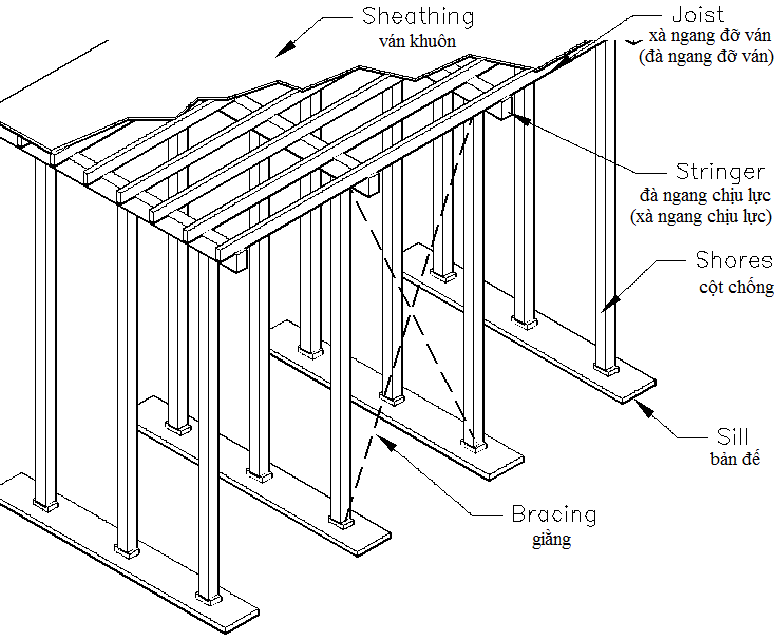
Schematic sketch of traditional formwork

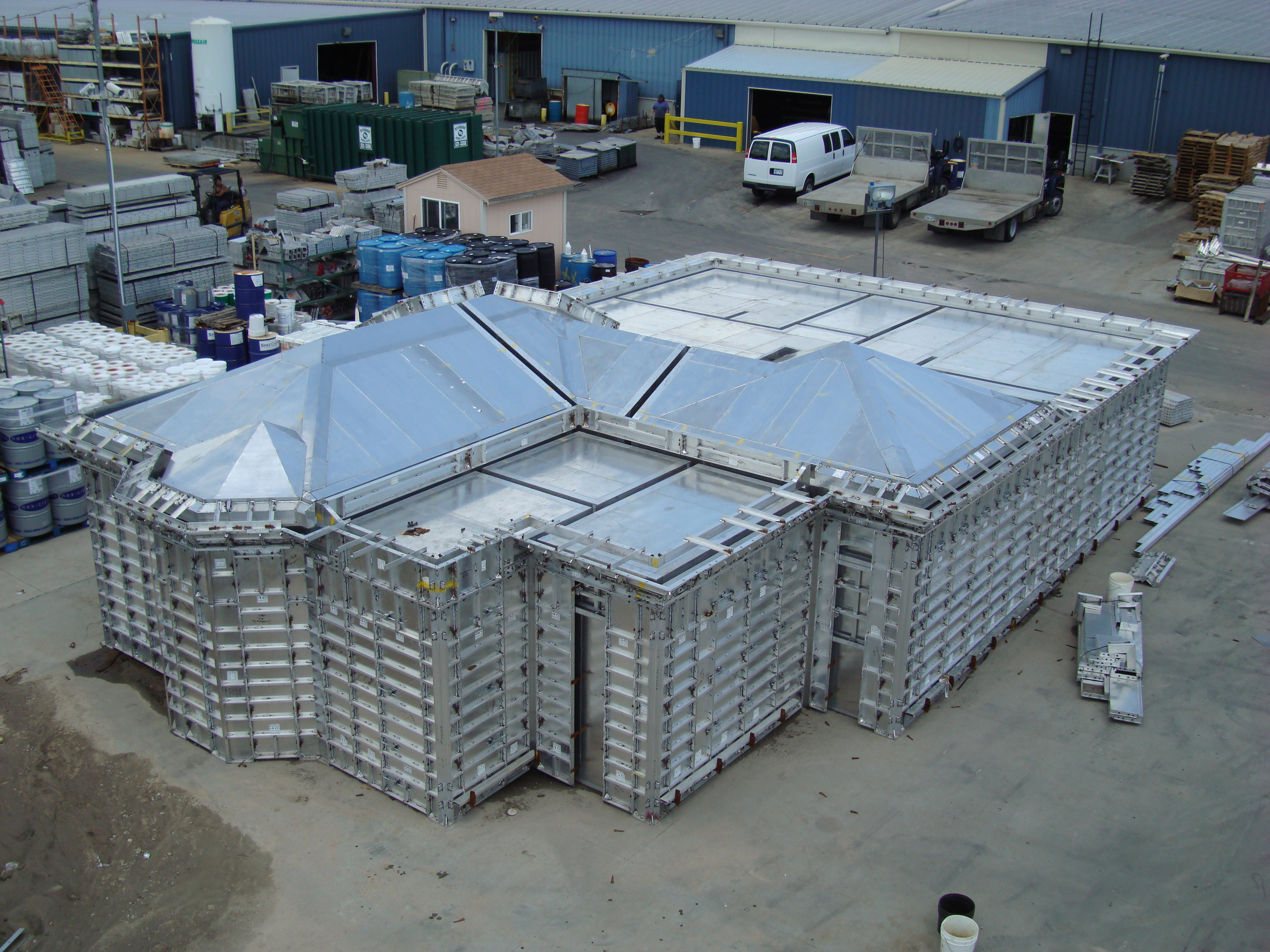
Modular formwork with deck for housing project in Chile

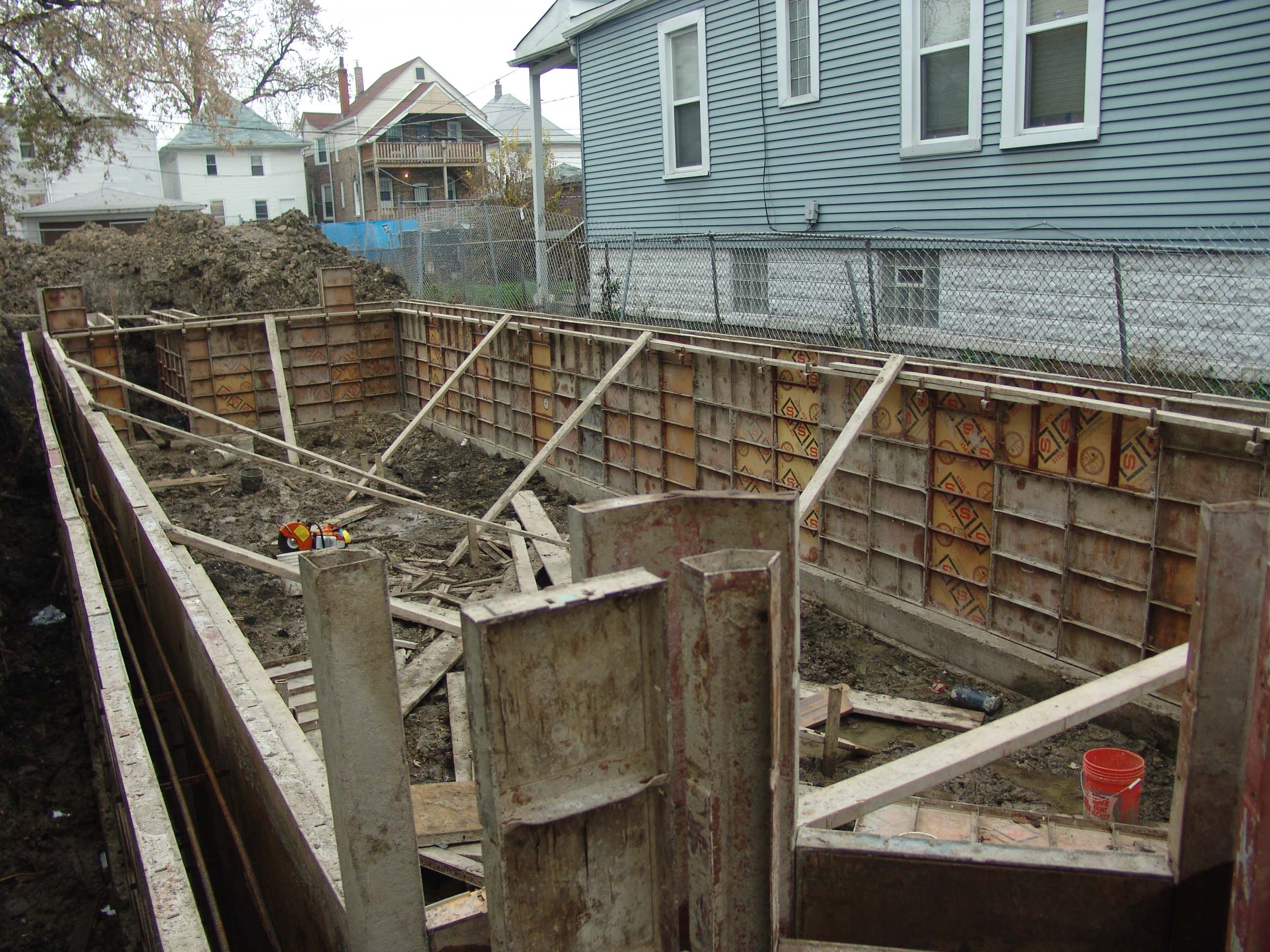
Steel and plywood formwork for poured-in-place concrete foundation

=== History ===
Some of the earliest examples of concrete slabs were built by Roman engineers. Because concrete is quite strong in resisting compressive loads, but has relatively poor tensile or torsional strength, these early structures consisted of compression-resistant arches, vaults and domes. The most notable concrete structure from this period is the Pantheon in Rome. To mould this structure, temporary scaffolding and formwork or falsework was built in the future shape of the structure. These building techniques were not isolated to pouring concrete, but were and are widely used in masonry construction. Because of the complexity and the limited production capacity of the building material, concrete's rise as a favored building material did not occur until the invention of Portland cement and reinforced concrete.

=== Timber beam slab formwork ===
Similar to the traditional method, but stringers and joists are typically replaced with engineered wood beams and supports are replaced with adjustable metal props. This makes this method more systematic and reusable.

=== Traditional slab formwork ===
Traditional timber formwork on a jetty in Bangkok

On the dawn of the revival of concrete in slab structures, building techniques for the temporary structures were derived again from masonry and carpentry. The traditional slab formwork technique consists of supports out of lumber or young tree trunks, that support rows of stringers assembled roughly 3 to 6 feet or 1 to 2 metres apart, depending on thickness of slab. Between these stringers, joists are positioned roughly 12 inches (30 cm) apart, upon which boards or plywood are placed. The stringers and joists are usually 4 by 4 inch or 4 by 6 inch lumber. The most common imperial plywood thickness is 3/4 inch and the most common metric thickness is 18 mm.

=== Metal beam slab formwork ===
Similar to the traditional method, but stringers and joist are replaced with aluminium forming systems or steel beams and supports are replaced with metal props. This also makes this method more systematic and reusable. Aluminum beams are fabricated as telescoping units which allows them to span supports that are located at varying distances apart. Telescoping aluminium beams can be used and reused in the construction of structures of varying size.

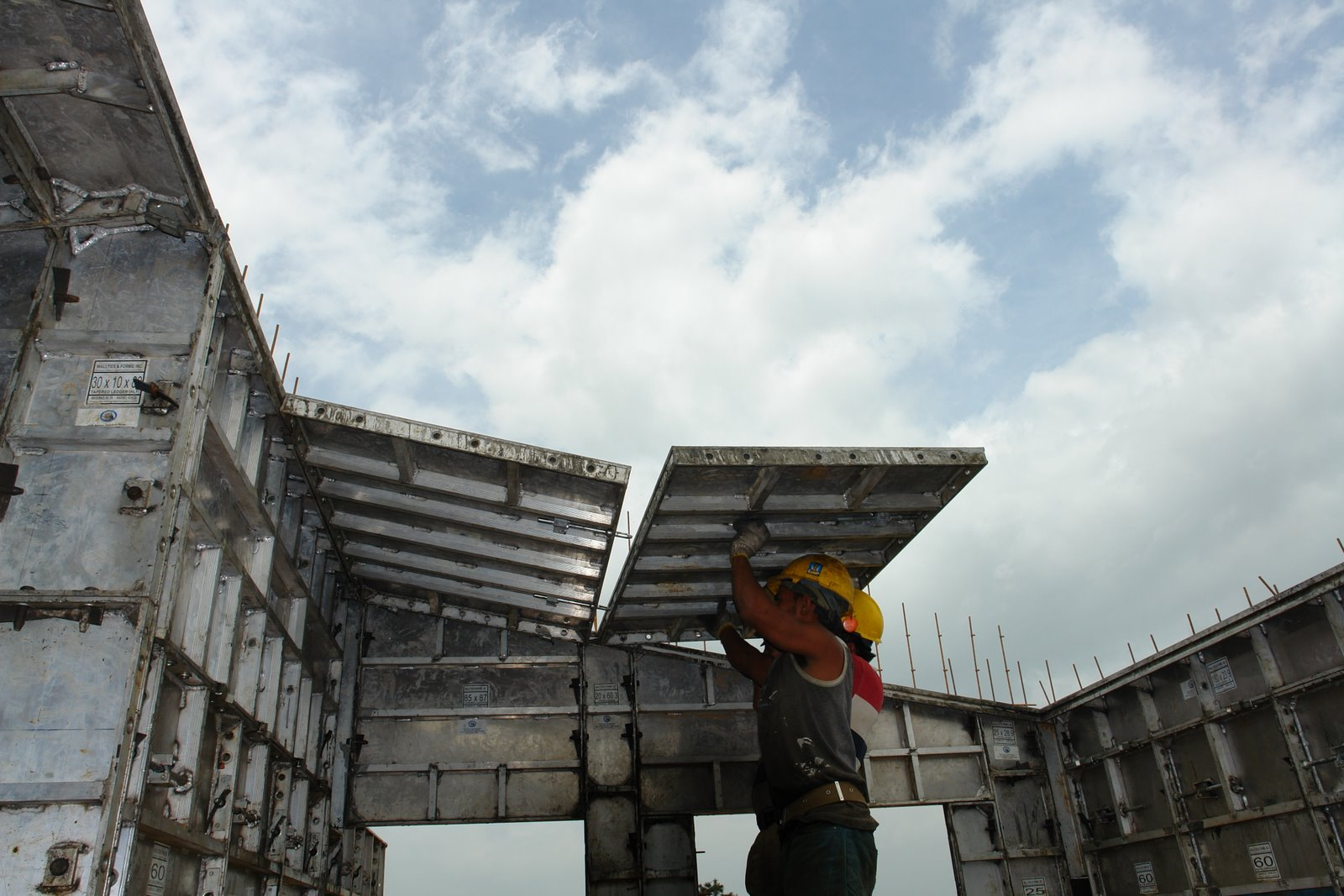
Hand setting modular aluminum deck formwork

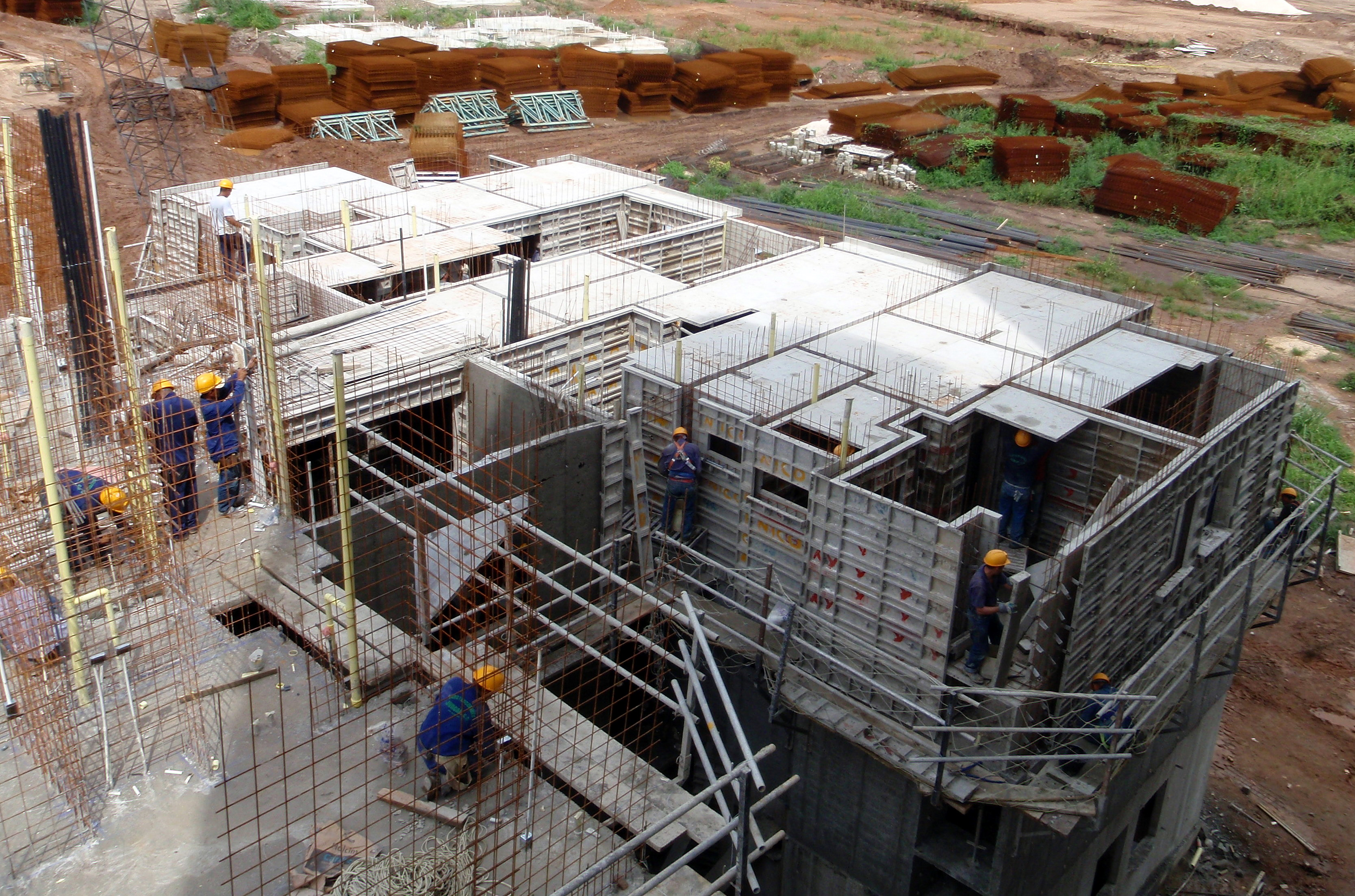
Handset modular aluminum formwork

=== Modular slab formwork ===
These systems consist of prefabricated timber, steel or aluminum beams and formwork modules. Modules are often no larger than 3 to 6 feet or 1 to 2 metres in size. The beams and formwork are typically set by hand and pinned, clipped, or screwed together. The advantages of a modular system are: does not require a crane to place the formwork, speed of construction with unskilled labor, formwork modules can be removed after concrete sets leaving only beams in place prior to achieving design strength.

=== Table or flying form systems ===
These systems consist of slab formwork "tables" that are reused on multiple stories of a building without being dismantled. The assembled sections are either lifted per elevator or "flown" by crane from one story to the next. Once in position the gaps between the tables or table and wall are filled with temporary formwork. Table forms vary in shape and size as well as their building material, with some supported by integral trusses. The use of these systems can greatly reduce the time and manual labor involved in setting and striking (or "stripping") the formwork. Their advantages are best used by large area and simple structures. It is also common for architects and engineers to design building around one of these systems.

Flying formwork tables with aluminium and timber joists. In this system the tables are supported by adjustable shoes attached to previously poured columns and walls

==== Structure ====
A table is built pretty much the same way as a beam formwork but the single parts of this system are connected together in a way that makes them transportable. The most common sheathing is plywood, but steel and fiberglass are used. The joists are either made from timber, engineered lumber (often in the form of I-beams), aluminium or steel. The stringers are sometimes made of wood I-beams but usually from steel channels. These are fastened together (screwed, weld or bolted) to become a "deck". These decks are usually rectangular but can also be other shapes.

==== Support ====
All support systems have to be height adjustable to allow the formwork to be placed at the correct height and to be removed after the concrete is cured. Normally adjustable metal props similar to (or the same as) those used by beam slab formwork are used to support these systems. Some systems combine stringers and supports into steel or aluminum trusses. Yet other systems use metal frame shoring towers, which the decks are attached to. Another common method is to attach the formwork decks to previously cast walls or columns, thus eradicating the use of vertical props altogether. In this method, adjustable support shoes are bolted through holes (sometimes tie holes) or attached to cast anchors.

==== Size ====
The size of these tables can vary from 70 to 1,500 square feet (6.5 to 140 m^{2}). There are two general approaches in this system:

1. Crane handled: this approach consists of assembling or producing the tables with a large formwork area that can only be moved up a level by crane. Typical widths can be 15, 18 or 20 feet, or 5 to 7 metres, but their width can be limited, so that it is possible to transport them assembled, without having to pay for an oversize load. The length might vary and can be up to 100 feet (or more) depending on the crane capacity. After the concrete is cured, the decks are lowered and moved with rollers or trolleys to the edge of the building. From then on the protruding side of the table is lifted by crane while the rest of the table is rolled out of the building. After the centre of gravity is outside of the building the table is attached to another crane and flown to the next level or position.

This technique is fairly common in the United States and east Asian countries. The advantages of this approach are the further reduction of manual labour time and cost per unit area of slab and a simple and systematic building technique. The disadvantages of this approach are the necessary high lifting capacity of building site cranes, additional expensive crane time, higher material costs and little flexibility.

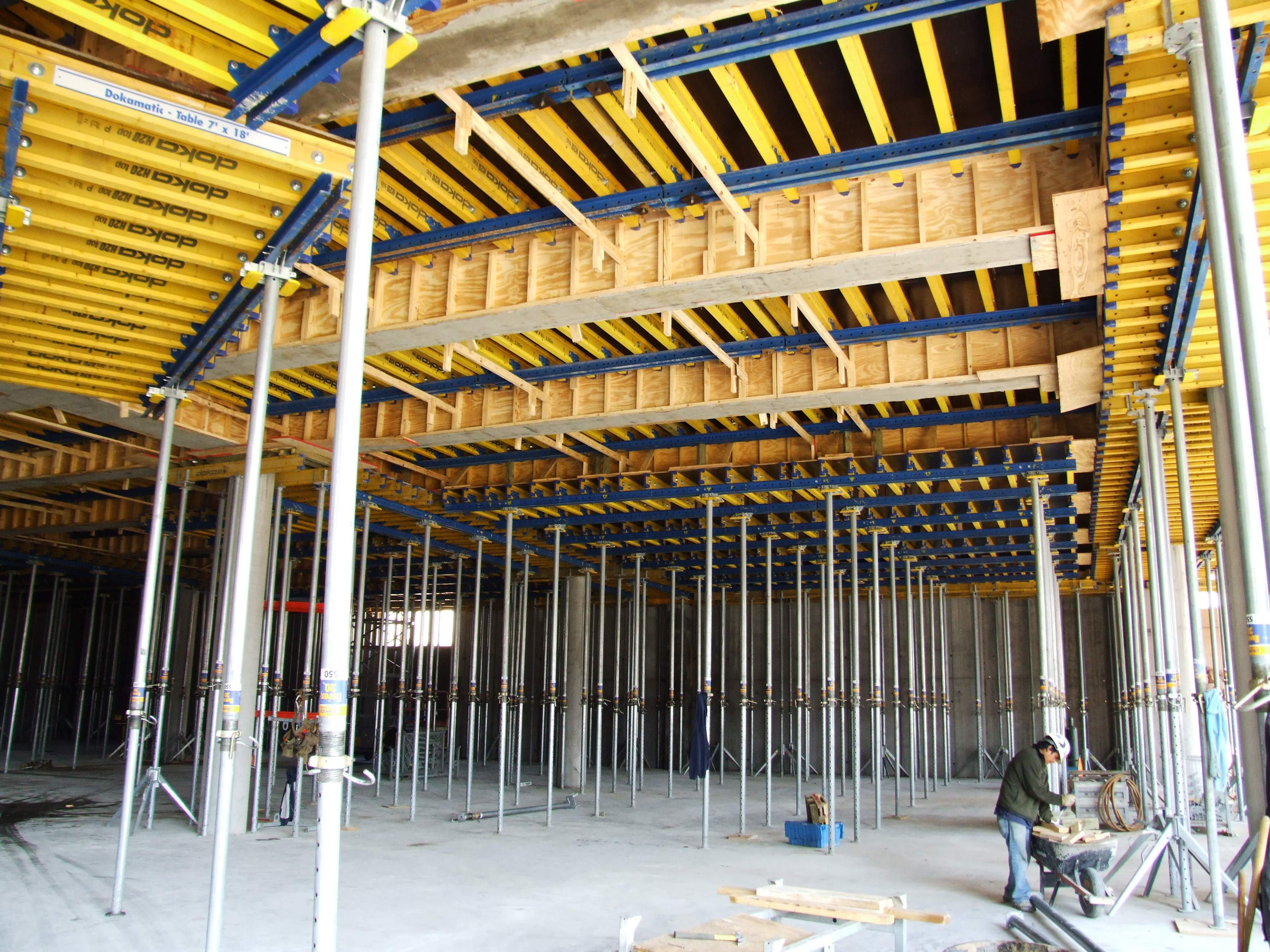
Formwork tables in use at a building site with more complicated structural features

2. Crane fork or elevator handled:

By this approach the tables are limited in size and weight. Typical widths are between 6 and 10 feet (1.8 and 3.0 m), typical lengths are between 12 and 20 feet (3.7 and 6.1 m), though table sizes may vary in size and form. The major distinction of this approach is that the tables are lifted either with a crane transport fork or by material platform elevators attached to the side of the building. They are usually transported horizontally to the elevator or crane lifting platform singlehandedly with shifting trolleys depending on their size and construction. Final positioning adjustments can be made by trolley. This technique enjoys popularity in the US, Europe and generally in high labor cost countries. The advantages of this approach in comparison to beam formwork or modular formwork is a further reduction of labor time and cost. Smaller tables are generally easier to customize around geometrically complicated buildings, (round or non rectangular) or to form around columns in comparison to their large counterparts. The disadvantages of this approach are the higher material costs and increased crane time (if lifted with crane fork).

=== Tunnel forms ===
Tunnel forms are large, room size forms that allows walls and floors to be cast in a single pour. With multiple forms, the entire floor of a building can be done in a single pour. Tunnel forms require sufficient space exterior to the building for the entire form to be slipped out and hoisted up to the next level. A section of the walls is left uncasted to remove the forms. Typically castings are done with a frequency of 4 days. Tunnel forms are most suited for buildings that have the same or similar cells to allow re-use of the forms within the floor and from one floor to the next, in regions which have high labor prices. Tunnel formwork saves the time and the cost. The cost of using the Tunnel Form system depends on several factors, including the scale of the project, material costs, labor, and the specific site conditions. While the initial investment may seem high, the long-term savings and efficiency can make this method more economical for large-scale projects.

See structural coffer.

=== Concrete-form oil ===
The main purpose of concrete-form oil is to reduce the adhesion between the foundation structure and the concrete mixture poured into it. It also reduces the possibility of cracks and chips occurring due to drying out or concrete overstressing. Without concrete-form oil, which reduces the adhesion between surfaces, it becomes virtually impossible to remove the structure without damaging the foundation, wall or bulkhead. The risk also increases with the size of the tier.

== Climbing formwork ==
Climbing formwork, also known as jumpform, is a special type formwork for vertical concrete structures that rises with the building process. While relatively complicated and costly, it can be an effective solution for buildings that are either very repetitive in form (such as towers or skyscrapers) or that require a seamless wall structure (using gliding formwork, a special type of climbing formwork).

Various types of climbing formwork exist, which are either relocated from time to time, or can even move on their own (usually on hydraulic jacks, required for self-climbing and gliding formworks).

Climbing forms are commonly used on:

- Skyscrapers
- Bridge pylons
- Concrete columns
- Airport control towers
- High rise buildings
- Elevator shafts
- Silos

== Flexible formwork ==
There is an increasing focus on sustainability in design, backed up by carbon dioxide emissions reduction targets. The low embodied energy of concrete by volume is offset by its rate of consumption which make the manufacture of cement accountable for some 5% of global CO_{2} emissions.

Concrete is a fluid that offers the opportunity to economically create structures of almost any geometry - concrete can be poured into a mould of almost any shape. The result, however, is high material use structures with large carbon footprints. The ubiquitous use of orthogonal moulds as concrete formwork has resulted in a well-established vocabulary of prismatic forms for concrete structures, yet such rigid formwork systems must resist considerable pressures and consume significant amounts of material. Moreover, the resulting member requires more material and has a greater self-weight than one cast with a variable cross section.

Simple optimisation methods may be used to design a variable cross section member in which the flexural and shear capacity at any point along the element length reflects the requirements of the loading envelope applied to it.

By replacing conventional moulds with a flexible system composed primarily of low cost fabric sheets, flexible formwork takes advantage of the fluidity of concrete to create highly optimised, architecturally interesting building forms. Significant material savings can be achieved. The optimised section provides ultimate limit state capacity while reducing embodied carbon, thus improving the life cycle performance of the entire structure.

Control of the flexibly formed beam cross section is key to achieving low-material use design. The basic assumption is that a sheet of flexible permeable fabric is held in a system of falsework before reinforcement and concrete are added. By varying the geometry of the fabric mould with distance along the beam, the optimised shape is created. Flexible formwork therefore has the potential to facilitate the change in design and construction philosophy that will be required for a move towards a less material intensive, more sustainable, construction industry.

Fabric formwork is a small niche in concrete technology. It uses soft, flexible materials as formwork against the fresh concrete, normally with some sort of strong tension textile or plastic material. The International Society of Fabric Forming conducts research on fabric formwork.

=== Iron sheet formwork ===
A design from Russian NPO-22 factory (trademarked as Proster, with model 21 designed to serve as formwork) uses iron "sheets" (with perforations) which, if necessary, can be bent to form a curve. The sheet-based formwork with V-shaped rails keeps shape in one direction (vertically) but, before being reinforced with steel beams, can be bent. Multiple sheets can be fixed together in same manner fences made of iron "sheets" can be.

- A circle can be made from a single sheet of "21" formwork, allowing cylindrical columns to be poured.

== Usage ==
For removable forms, once the concrete has been poured into formwork and has set (or cured), the formwork is struck or stripped to expose the finished concrete. The time between pouring and stripping depends on the job specifications, which include the cure required, and whether the form is supporting any weight; it is usually at least 24 hours after the pour is completed. For example, the California Department of Transportation requires the forms to be in place for 1–7 days after pouring, while the Washington State Department of Transportation requires the forms to stay in place for 3 days with a damp blanket on the outside.

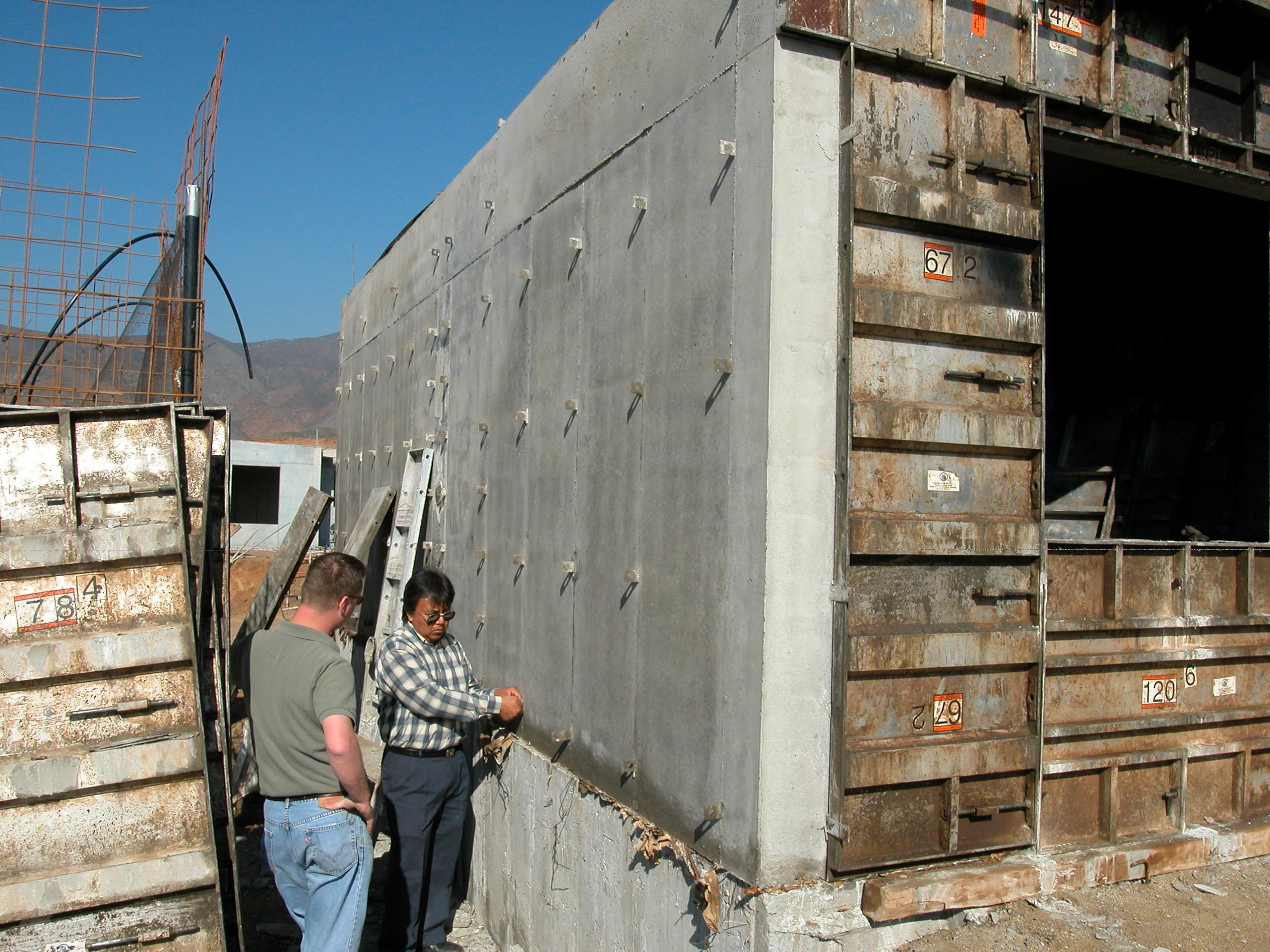
Formwork stripped exposing the set concrete

Spectacular accidents have occurred when the forms were either removed too soon or had been under-designed to carry the load imposed by the weight of the uncured concrete. "Form blowouts" also occur when under-designed formwork bends or breaks during the concrete pour (especially if filled with a high-pressure concrete pump). Consequences can vary from minor leaks, easily patched during the pour, to catastrophic form failure, even death.

Concrete exerts less pressure against the forms as it hardens. The hardening is an asymptotic process, meaning that most of the final strength will be achieved after a short time, with further hardening over time reflecting the cement type, admixtures, and pour conditions such as temperature and ambient moisture. The design strength of concrete must be reached after 28 days. Compressive strength is tested with a compressometer, a destructive test on concrete cubes or cylinders.

Wet concrete also applies horizontal hydrostatic pressure to formwork. The pressure at the bottom of the form is therefore greater than at the top, causing most blowouts to occur low in the formwork. In the illustration of the column formwork above, the 'column clamps' are closer together at the bottom. Note that the column is braced with steel adjustable 'formwork props' and uses 20 mm 'through bolts' to further support the long side of the column.

Some models of "permanent formwork" also can serve as extra reinforcement of the structure.

== Gallery ==
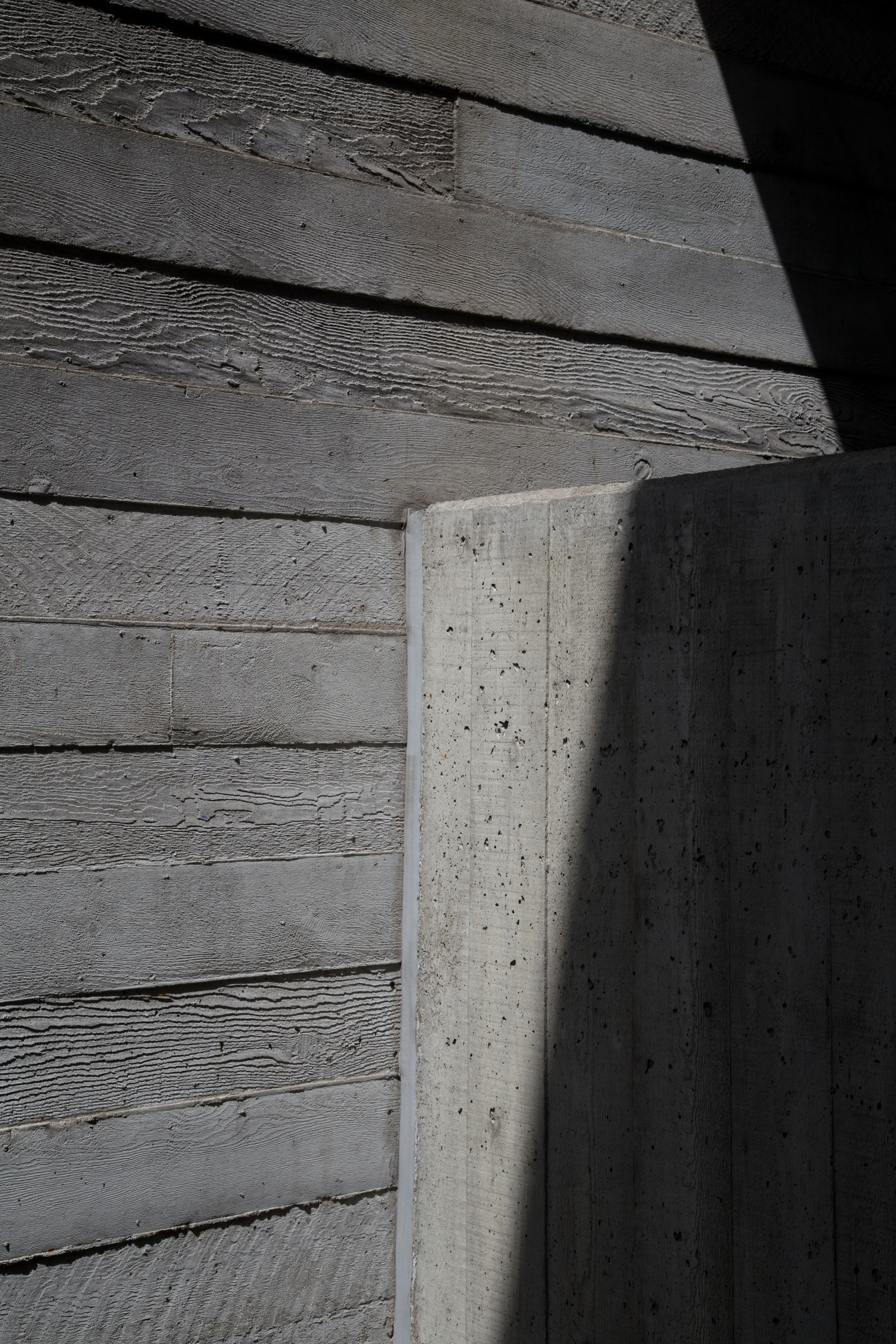
The concrete structure of the Royal National Theatre carries the impression of the timber shuttering

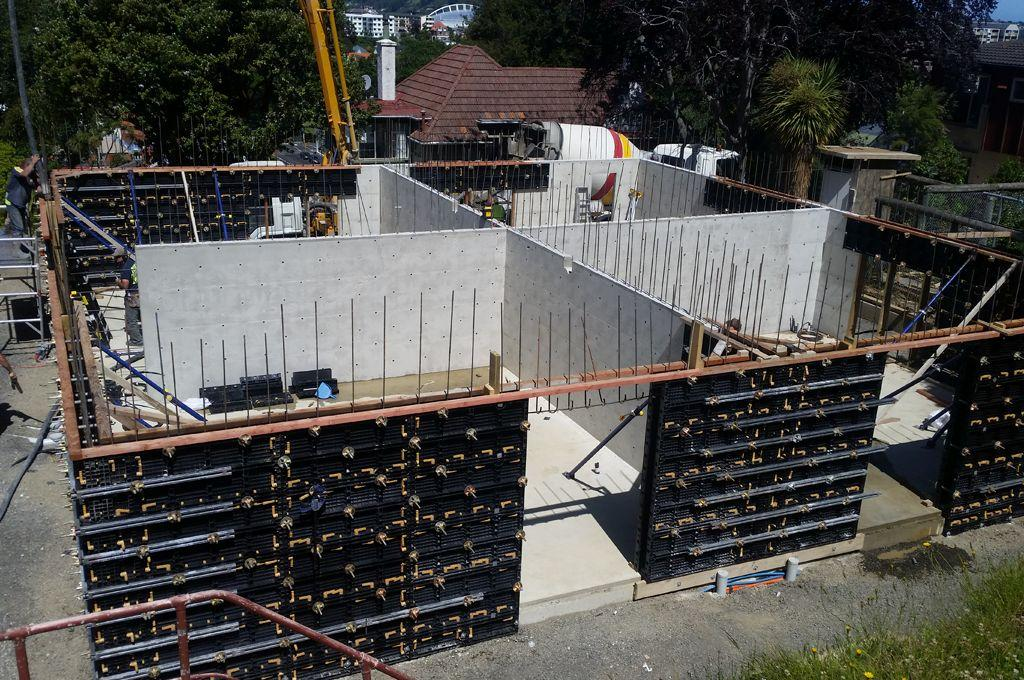
Plastic concrete formwork for cross wall

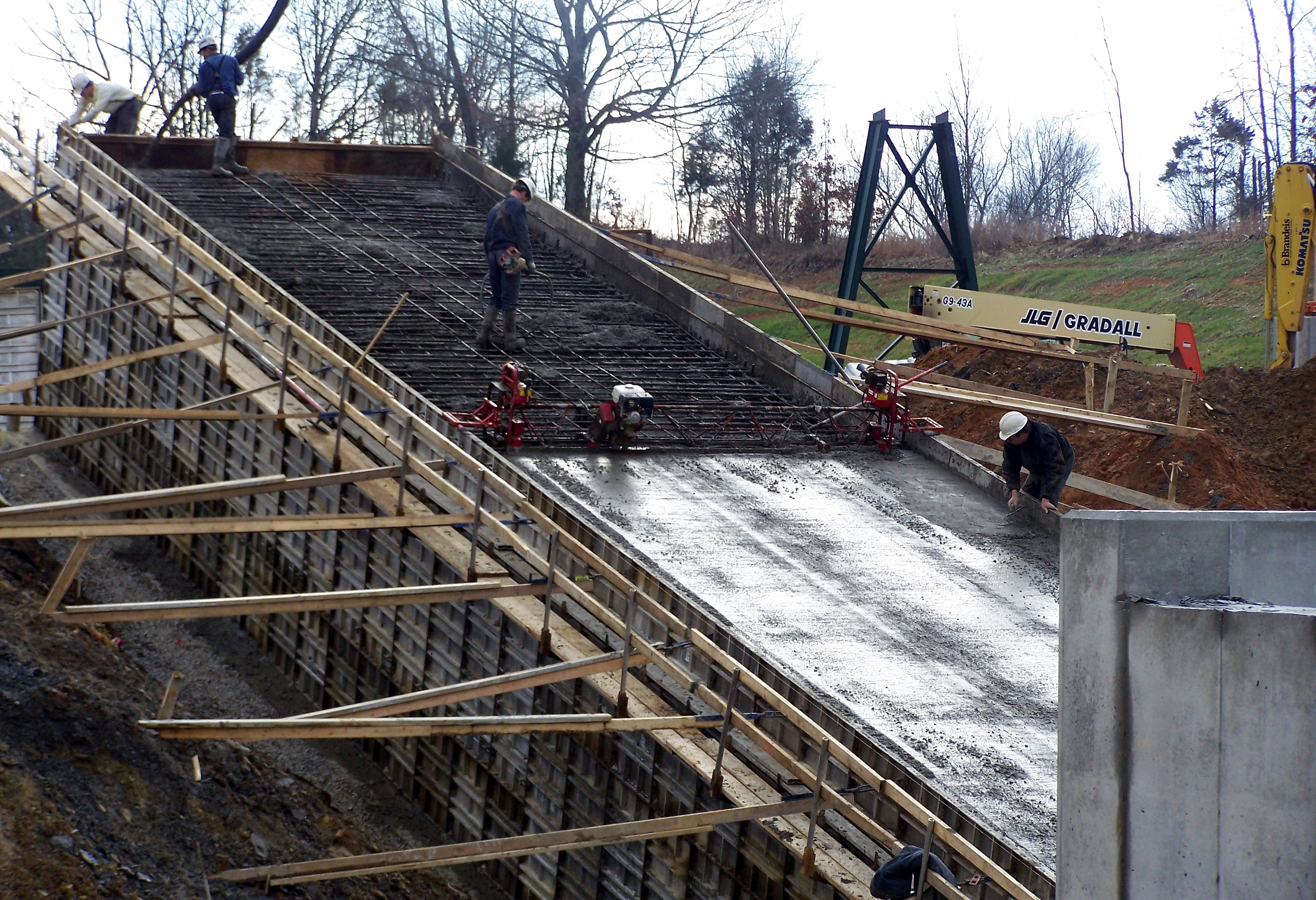
Coal tunnel constructed using handset aluminum concrete forms

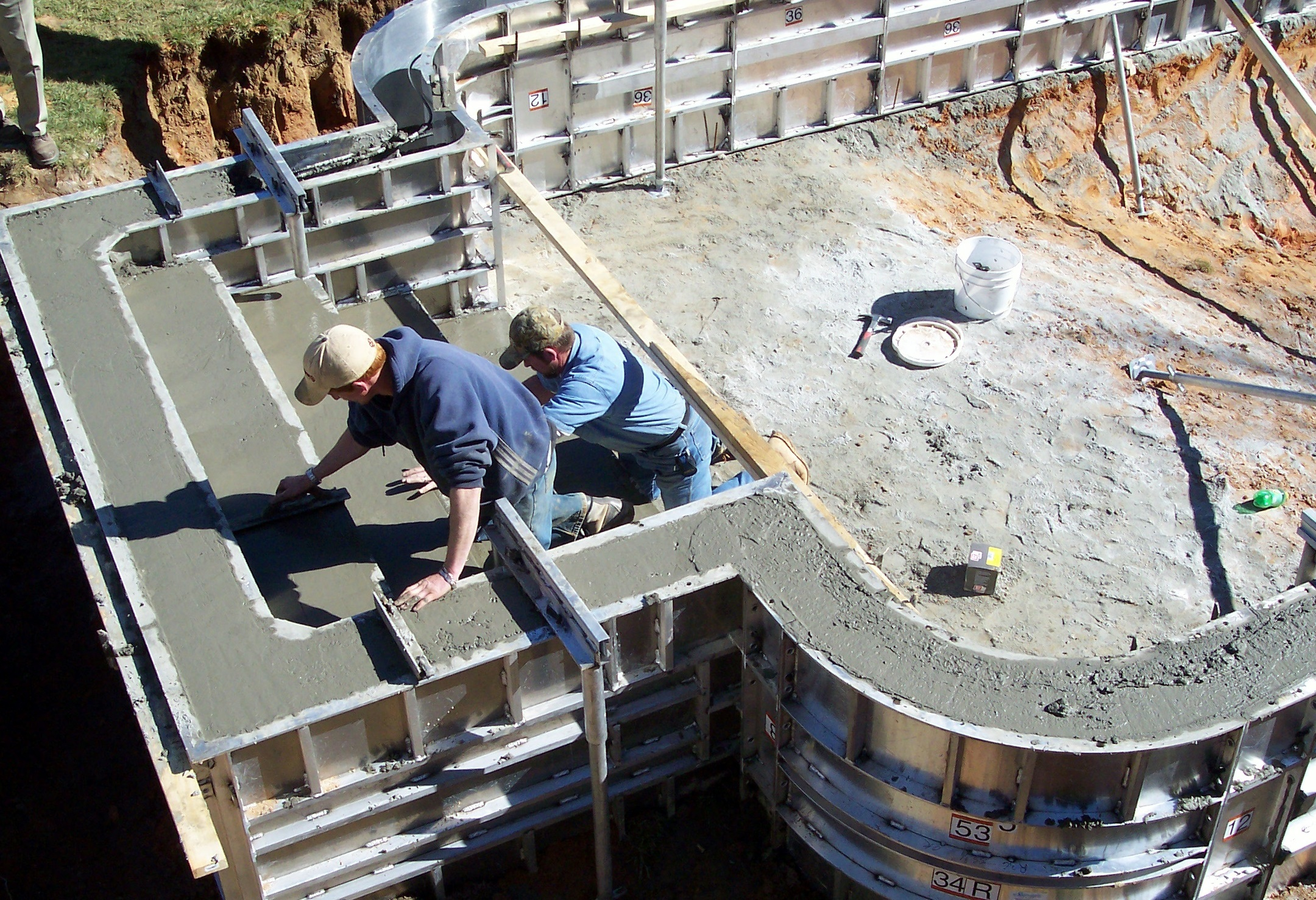
Concrete pool construction using aluminum concrete forms

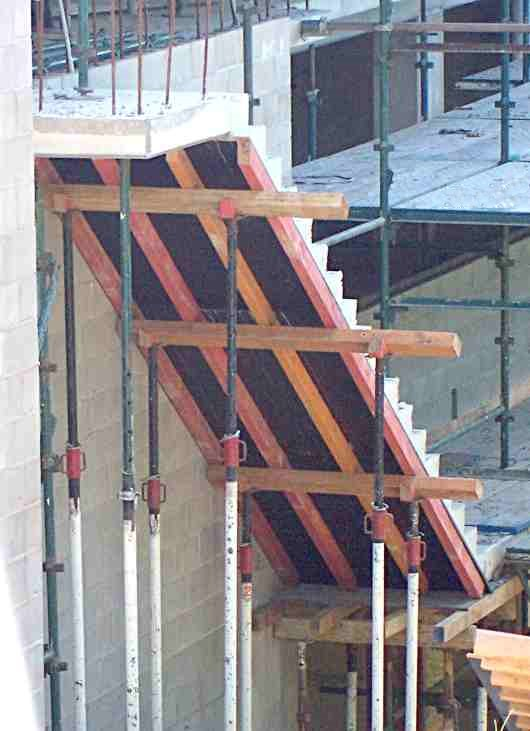
Soffit formwork to a flight of concrete stairs

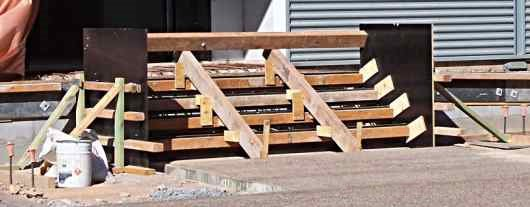
Stair formwork showing the use of strongbacks to support the riser shutters

Sketch showing the use timber props for beam forms

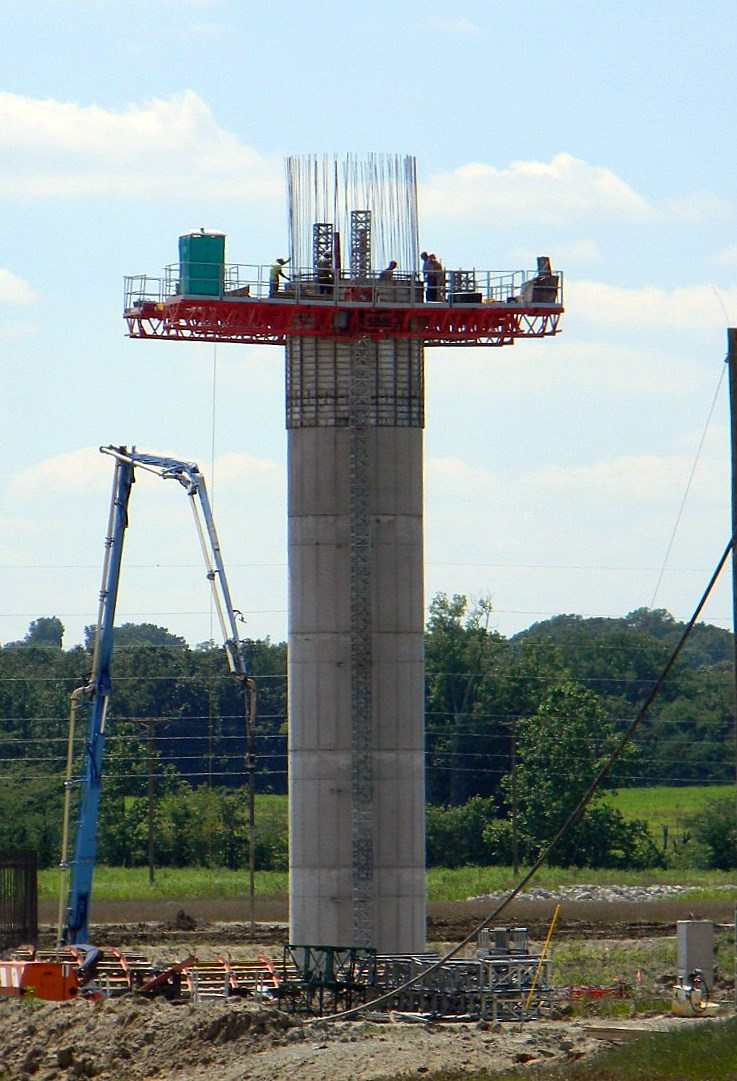
Coal silo construction using radius concrete formwork

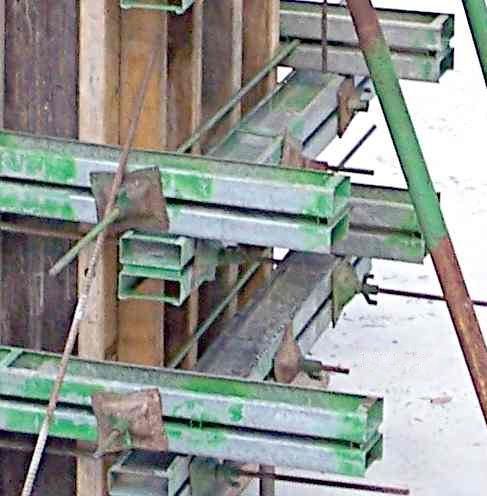
Twin steel walers and tie bolts used to secure wall forms

Column poured using spiral ducting

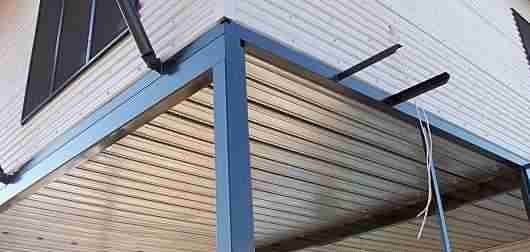
Concrete slab poured on roll formed galvanized steel with the form as a permanent part of the structure

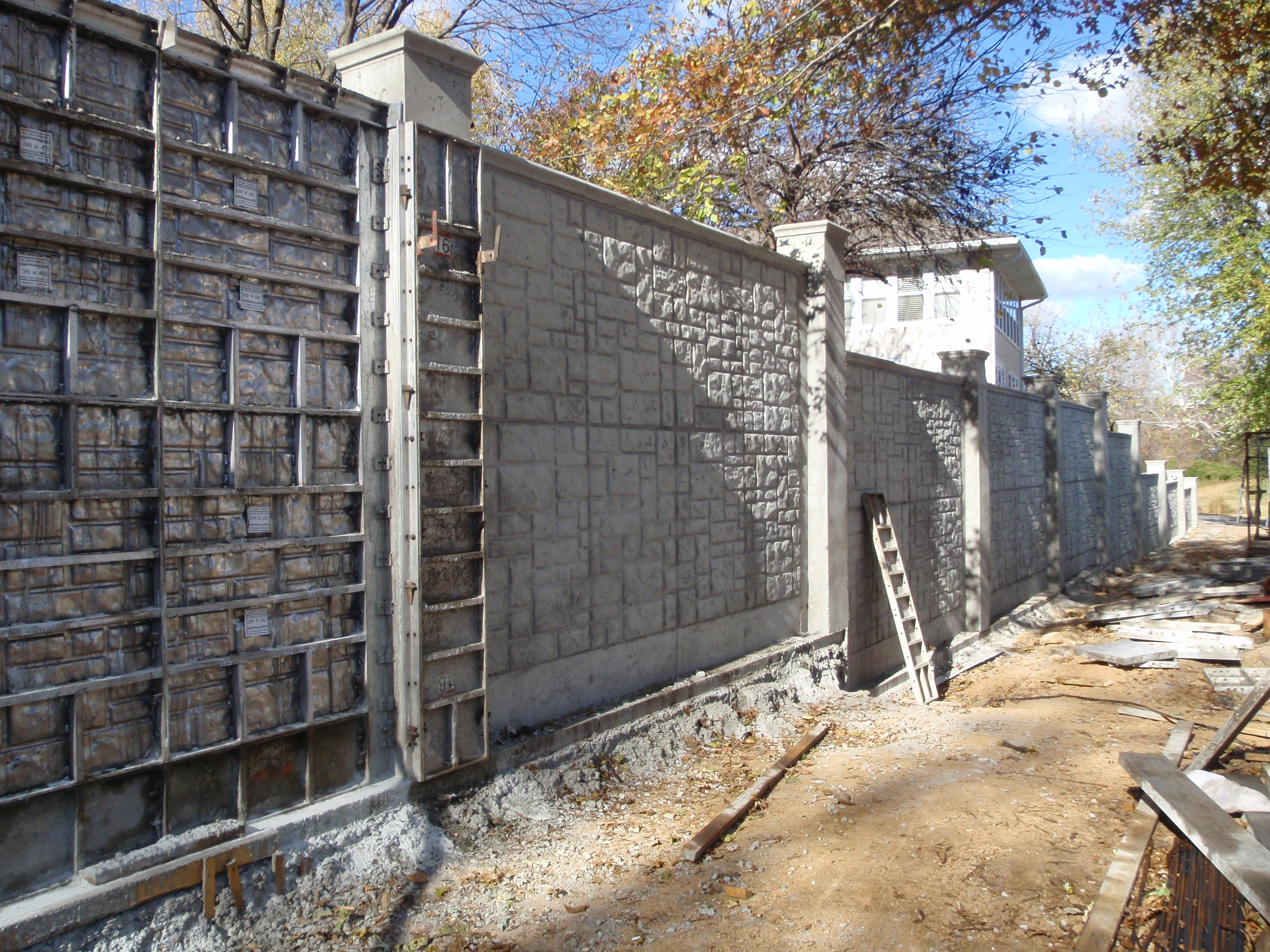
Concrete fence construction using aluminum forms to impart an ashlar stone impression in the finished product

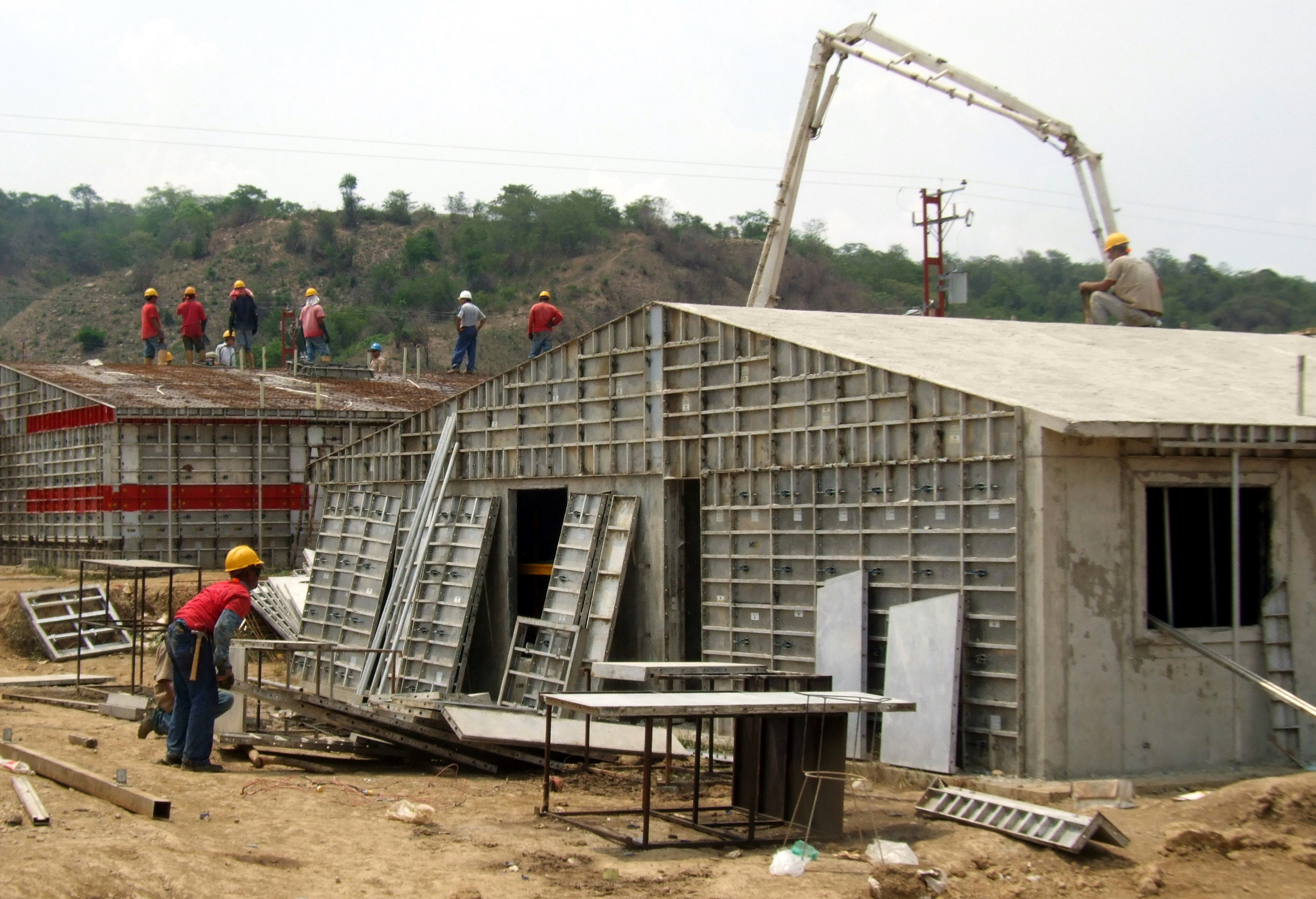
Concrete housing construction in Venezuela using aluminum concrete formwork

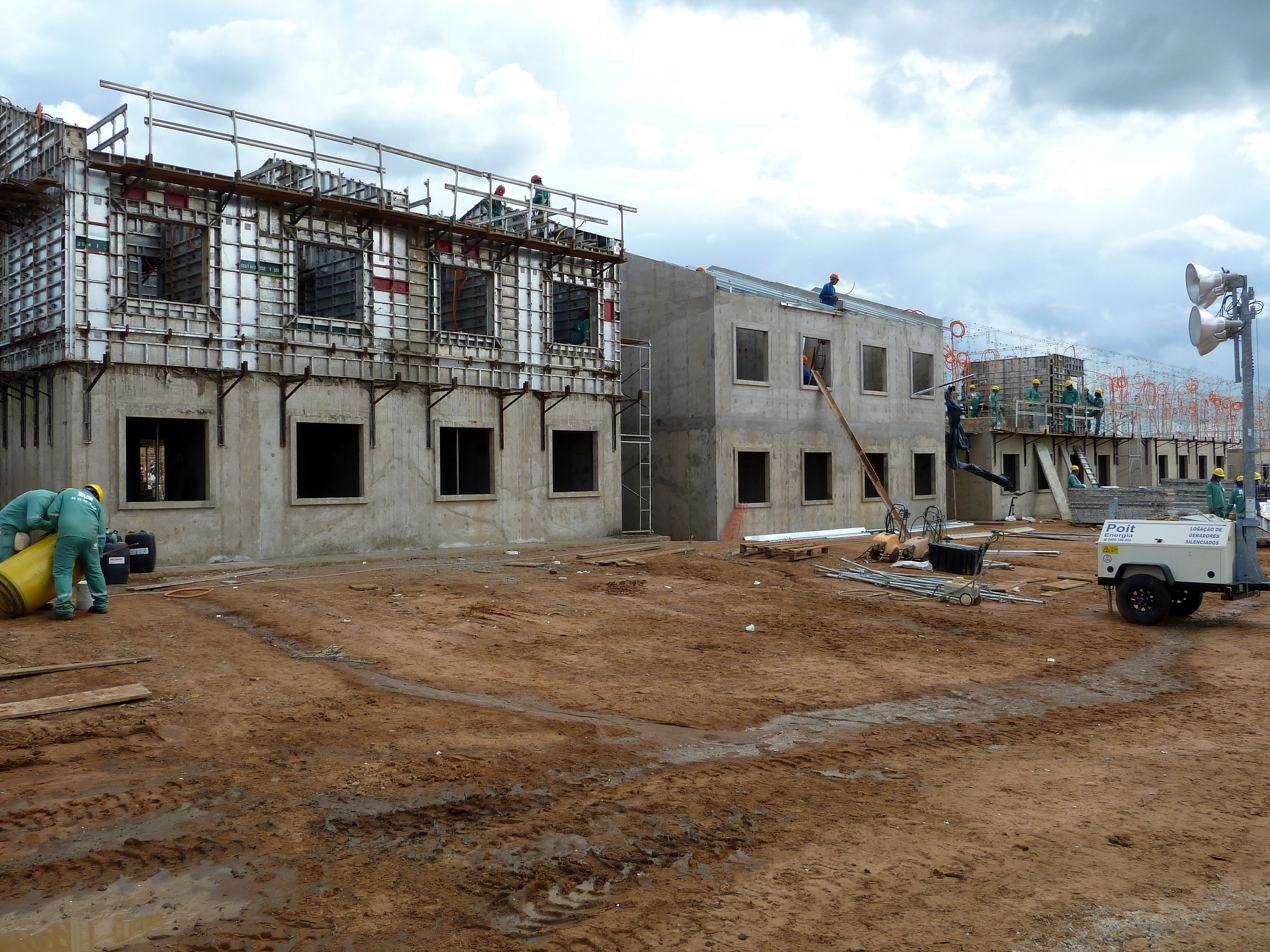
Concrete construction in Brazil using handset aluminum concrete formwork

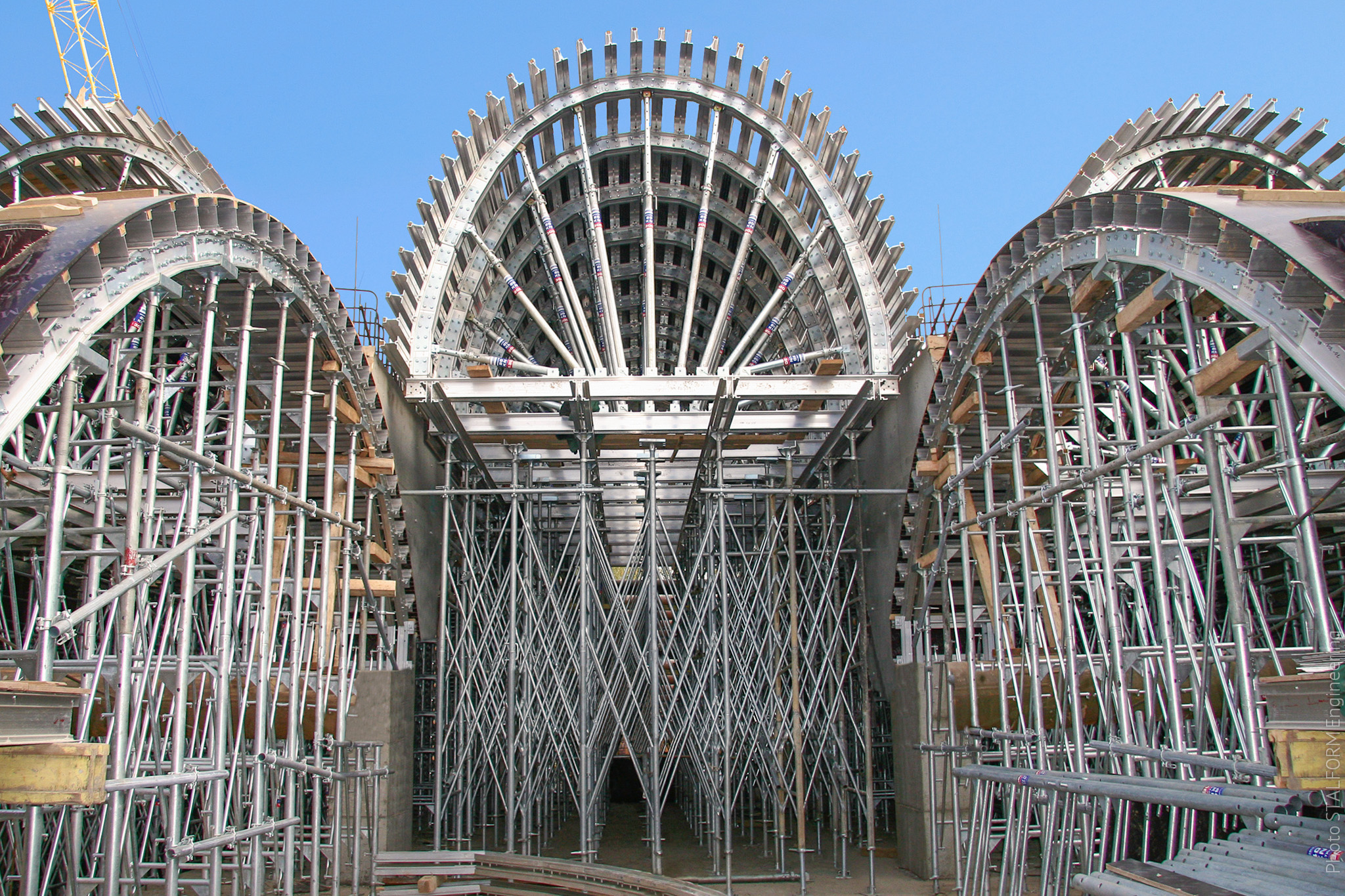
Concrete construction in Moscow metro using special aluminum concrete formwork

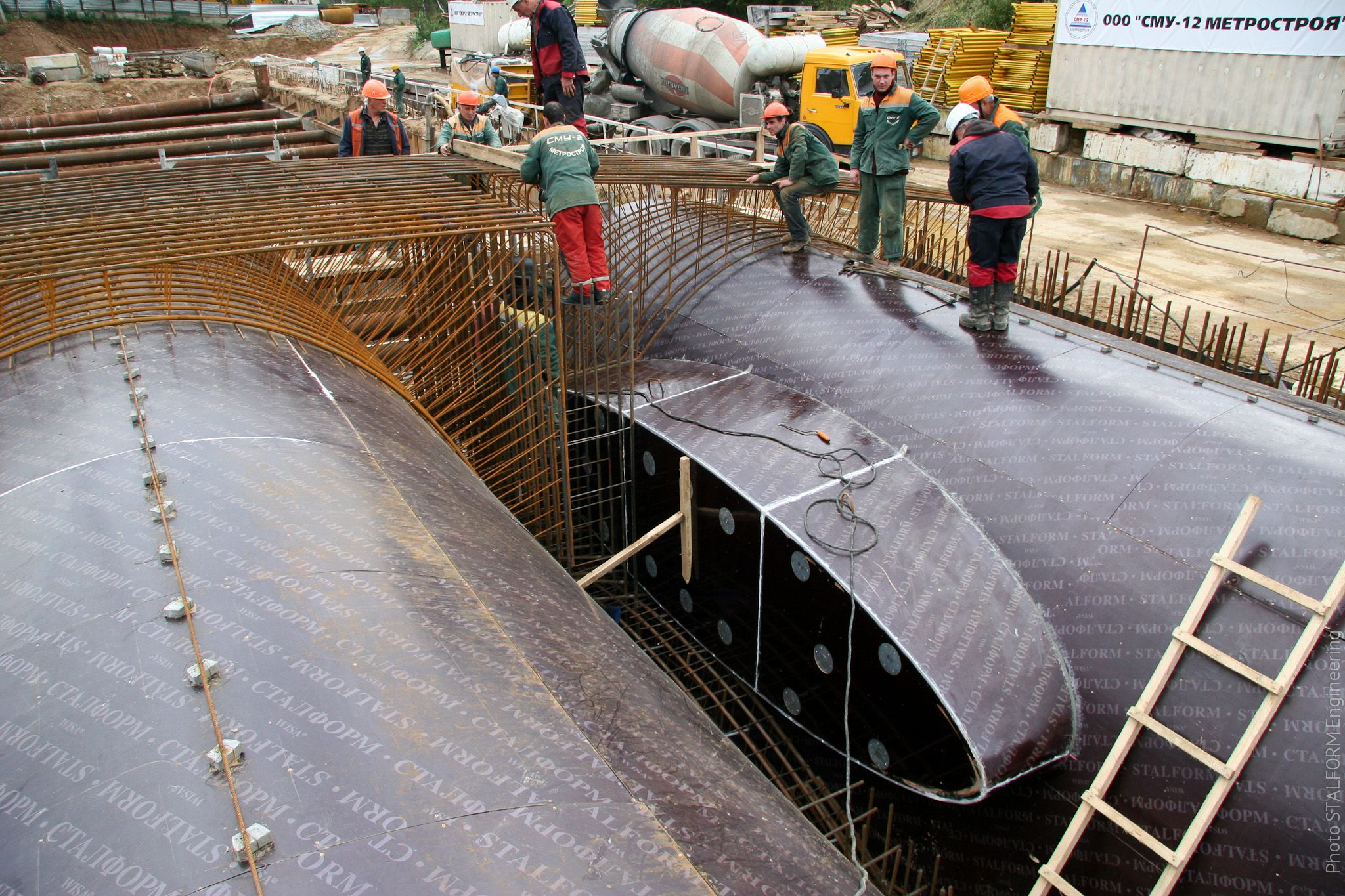
Engineered formwork system in Moscow metro

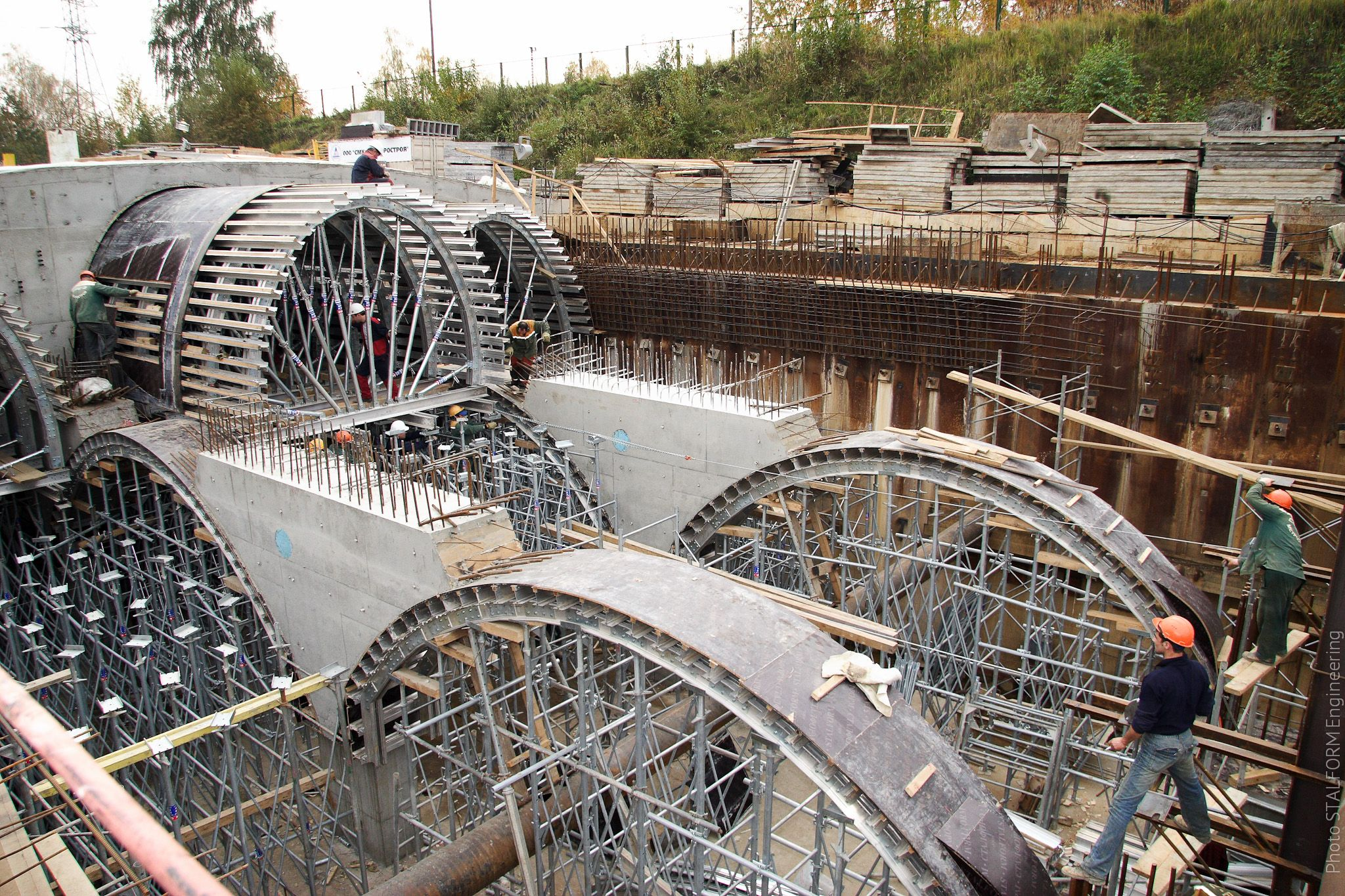
Engineered formwork system in Moscow metro

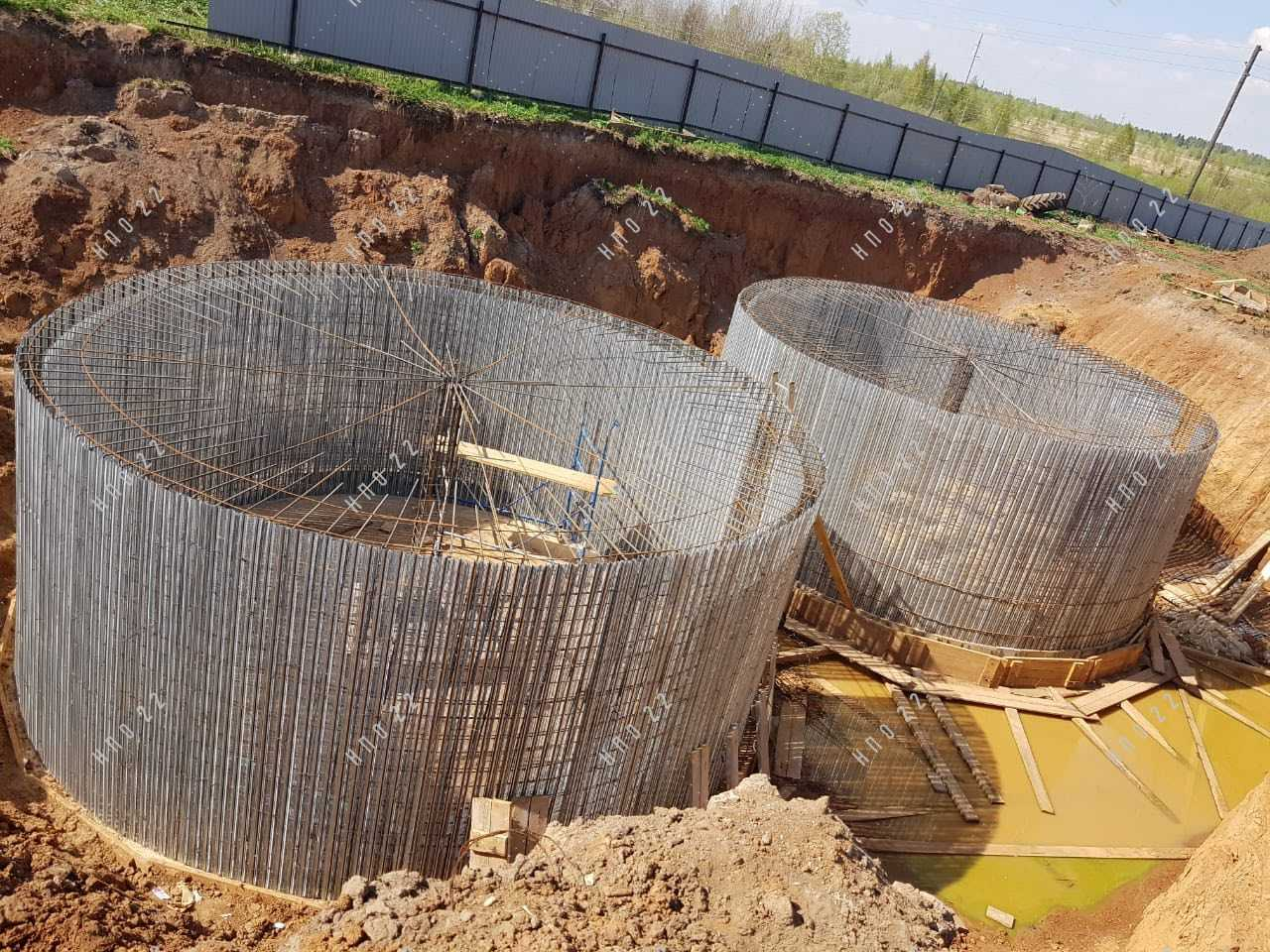
Pool construction using "Proster 21" flexible formwork.

== See also ==
- Cast in place concrete
- Climbing formwork, formwork that climbs up the rising building during the construction
- Concrete cover, depth of the concrete between reinforcing steel and outer surface
- Precast concrete
- Slip forming, construction method in which concrete is poured into a continuously moving form

== Literature ==
- Matthias Dupke: Einsatzgebiete der Gleitschalung und der Kletter-Umsetz-Schalung: Ein Vergleich der Systeme. 2010, Verlag Diplomarbeiten Agentur, Hamburg, ISBN 978-3-8386-0295-0.
- The Concrete Society, Formwork: A guide to good practice
