= Climbing formwork =

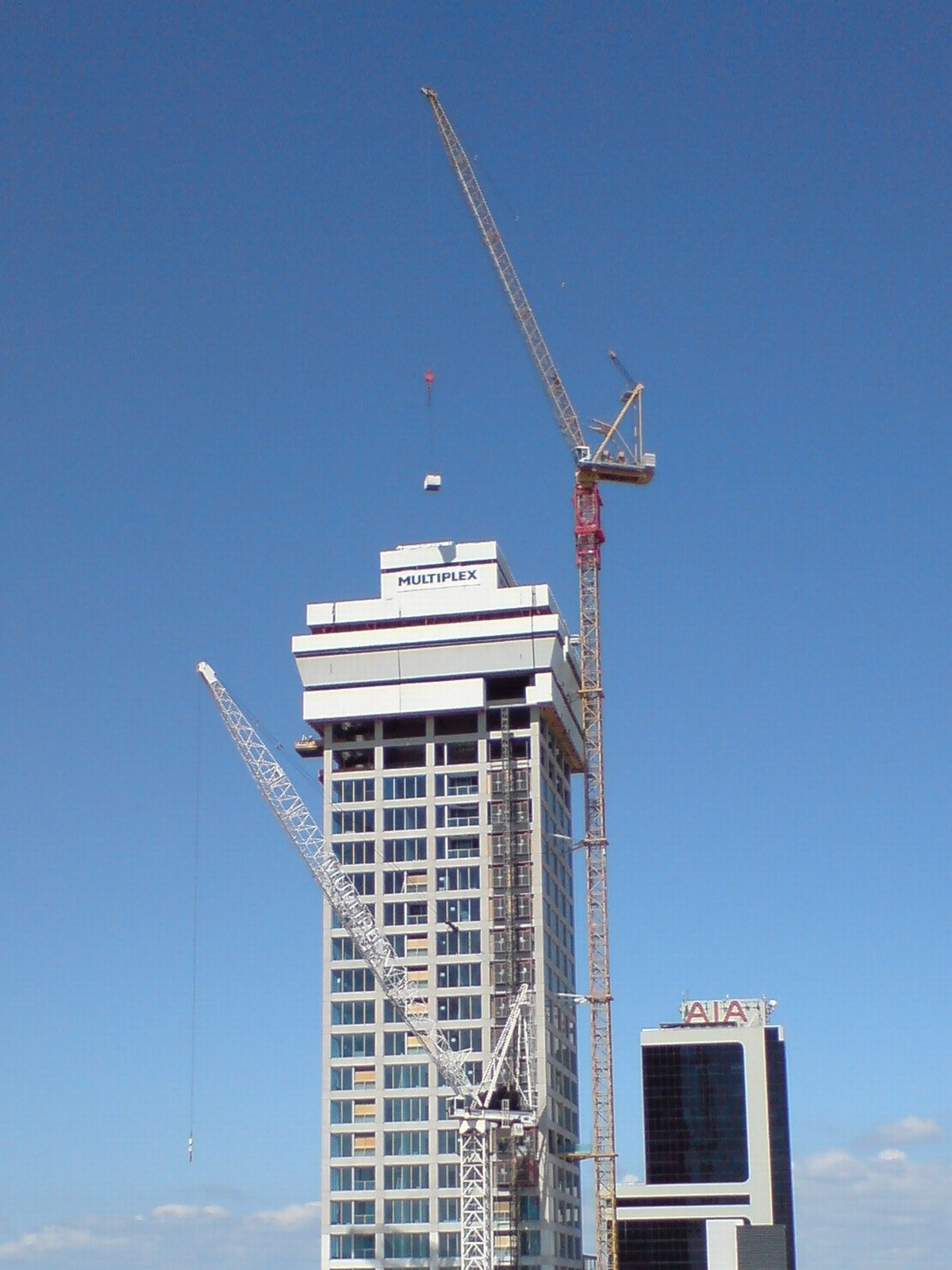
Climbing formwork on a future residential skyscraper in Takapuna, New Zealand—the whole white upper structure is actually formwork and associated working facilities.

Climbing formwork, also known as jumpform, is a special type formwork for vertical concrete structures that rises with the building process. While relatively complicated and costly, it can be an effective solution for buildings that are either very repetitive in form (such as towers or skyscrapers) or that require a seamless wall structure (using gliding formwork, a special type of climbing formwork).

Various types of climbing formwork exist, which are either relocated from time to time, or can even move on their own (usually on hydraulic jacks, required for self-climbing and gliding formworks).

== Process ==
Best known in the construction of towers, skyscrapers and other tall vertical structures, it allows the reuse of the same formwork over and over and over for identical (or very similar) sections / storeys further up the structure. It can also enable very large concrete structures to be constructed in one single pour (which may take days or weeks as the formwork rises with the process), thus creating seamless structures with enhanced strength and visual appearance, as well as reducing construction times and material costs (at the joints which would otherwise require extra reinforcement / connectors). An advantage of guided climbing systems is that they remain connected to the building during the lifting process.

The climbing formwork structure normally does not only contain the formwork itself, but also usually provides working space / scaffolds for construction crews. It may also provide areas for machinery and screens for weather protection, up to being fully enclosed while yet staying modular around a changing building structure.

A climbing formwork system is a controlled formwork method that advances tall reinforced-concrete structures upwards in defined concrete lifts. Depending on project requirements, it can be applied to bridge piers, viaduct supports, tall wall structures, industrial towers and reinforced-concrete elements of many different geometries. Once the structure has been completed up to the defined pour height, the formwork is moved to the next level, and the same work cycle is repeated up to the top of the structure.

== Types ==
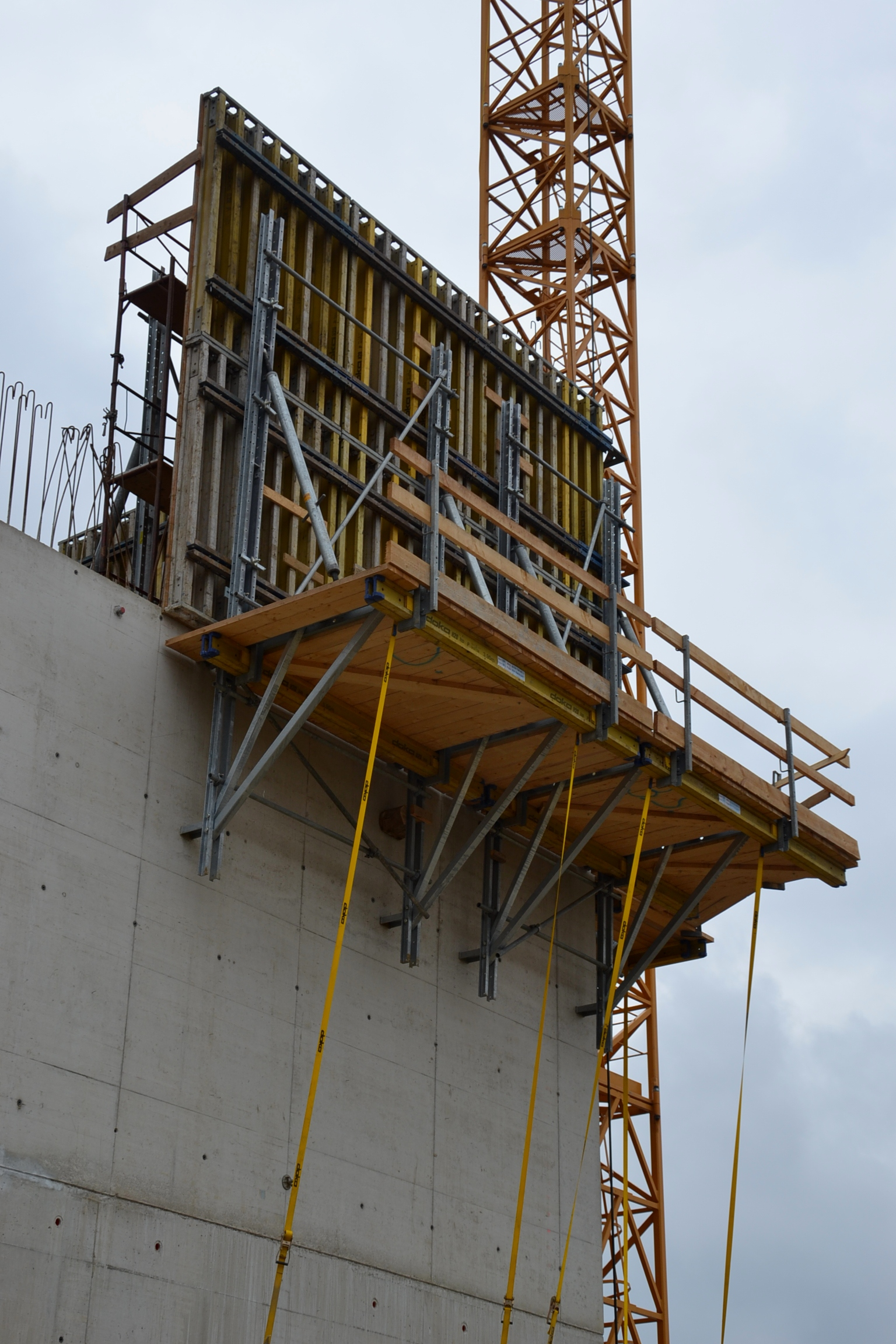
Crane-Climbing formwork: The working platform and the formwork are a unit

- Climbing formwork (crane-climbing): in this type of climbing formwork, the formwork around the structure is displaced upwards with the help of one or more cranes once the hardening of the concrete has proceeded far enough. This may entail lifting the whole section, or be achieved segmentally.
- Climbing formwork (self-climbing): In this type of formwork, the structure elevates itself with the help of mechanic leverage equipment (usually hydraulic). To do this, it is usually fixed to sacrificial cones or rails emplaced in the previously cast concrete.
- Gliding formwork: This type of formwork is similar to the self-climbing type above. However, the climbing process is continuous instead of intermittent, and is usually only interrupted for a very short time (for example to fix the mounting mechanisms to new anchoring points). The advantage is that it will produce seamless structures, but it requires a continuous, uninterrupted process throughout, with serious potential quality and stability problems if the pour has to be stopped.

== See also ==
- Formwork
- Skyscraper
- Cast-in-place concrete
