= Barkly =

Barkly may refer to:

== Places ==
=== Australia ===
==== Northern Territory ====
- Barkly Tableland, a region in the Northern Territory
- Barkly Highway, a national highway of both Queensland and Northern Territory
- Electoral division of Barkly, a rural electorate
- Barkly Region, a local government area

==== Queensland ====
- Barkly, Queensland, an outback locality within the City of Mount Isa

==== Victoria ====
- Barkly, Victoria, a town in the Pyrenees Shire

=== South Africa ===
- Barkly East, a South Africa town
- Barkly West, Northern Cape, a town in South Africa

== Other ==
- Henry Barkly (1815–1898), a British politician and colonial governor
- Anne Maria Barkly (1837-1892) botanist and governor's 2nd wife
- West Barkly languages, a small language family

== See also ==
- Barkley (disambiguation)
