= Barclay Theatre =

Performing arts theater in Irvine, California

Irvine Barclay Theatre
- The Barclay
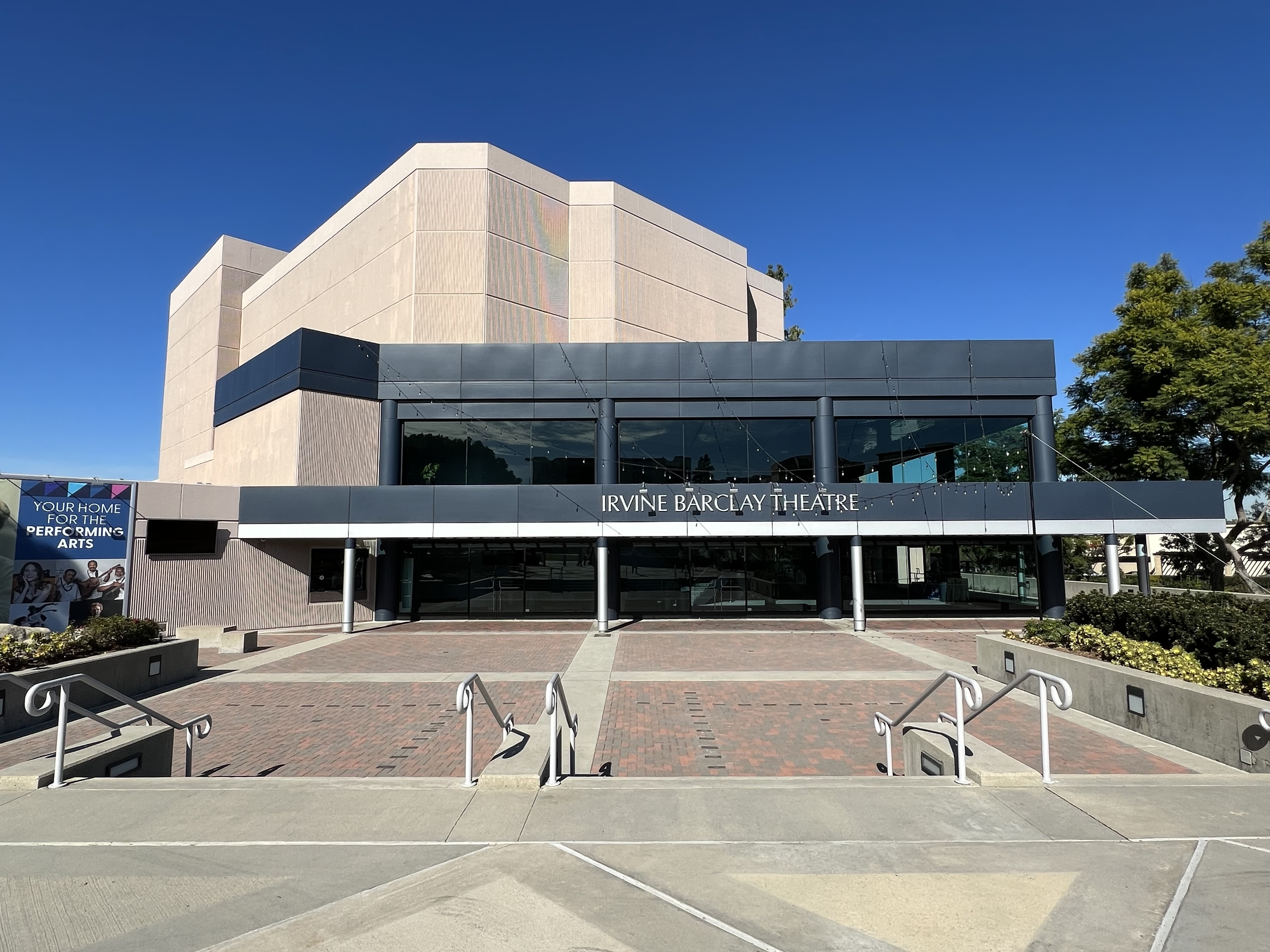
- Barclay Theatre in 2023
- Interactive map of Irvine Barclay Theatre
- Address: 4242 Campus Drive; Irvine, California; United States
- Coordinates: 33°38′57″N 117°50′27″W
- Owner: City of Irvine and UC Irvine
- Capacity: 755

Construction
- Opened: September 30, 1990; 35 years ago

Website
- www.thebarclay.org

The Irvine Barclay Theatre, often referred to as The Barclay, is a 755-seat performing arts venue in Irvine, California, located on the campus of the University of California, Irvine. Jointly owned by the city and university, it opened in 1990 and has hosted various musicians, bands, plays, and guest speakers. San Francisco-based architecture firm Wurster, Bernardi and Emmons designed the theater.

== History ==
Advocacy for a community theater in Irvine first arose in the 1970s; the city itself was incorporated in 1971. In 1986, a group of private investors as well as officials from the city and the University of California, Irvine formed a nonprofit called the Irvine Barclay Theatre Operating Company. Richard Barclay, a real estate developer, became the namesake after donating $1 million to the project. The total cost of the theater's creation and construction was $17.4 million with $11.3 million of funding provided by the city, $4.3 million from private donors, and $1.8 million from UC Irvine. The university also provided 2.3 acres (0.93 ha) of its land for the site of the facility. Media members previewed the venue ahead of its opening ceremony on September 30, 1990. The Los Angeles Times gave the theater a positive review, praising its design.

On March 23, 2004, former Soviet Union leader Mikhail Gorbachev was awarded the inaugural UCI Citizen Peacebuilding Award in a ceremony at the Barclay Theatre, where he thereafter gave a speech on environmental sustainability. During the speech, Gorbachev criticized the U.S. invasion of Iraq and at one point received a standing ovation from the crowd. Upon its first awarding, the university named the accolade after Gorbachev.

In 2012, Elvis Costello performed a concert at the Barclay.

In 2015, the Barclay Theatre hired former Segerstrom Center for the Arts president and CEO Jerry Mandel to be its president.

During the COVID-19 pandemic in 2020, the theater closed indefinitely. During its closure, the theater organization spent over $2 million to install new seats, carpet, lighting, and air conditioning in the venue. In summer 2021, the organization announced plans to reopen with a mask and vaccine requirement for patrons. The theater reopened on June 24, 2021, with a performance by soprano Renée Fleming restricted to two-thirds capacity.

== Architecture ==
Larry Cannon of San Francisco-based firm Wurster, Bernardi and Emmons designed the 755-seat Barclay Theatre. Its architectural style has been described as "Bay Area modernism" and Cannon expressed an emphasis on function over aesthetics. The theater house consists of sandblasted cast-in-place concrete. Upon the Barclay's opening in September 1990, the Los Angeles Times described the "jewel box" theater's interior as a "stripped-down rococo elegance" with a "feminine intimacy" that stands in contrast to the building's "cool, masculine" exterior. An architectural review published in November by the Times criticized some of its aspects, such as its courtyard and its "jarring" appearance during daytime compared to its "seductive" appearance in the evening.

The theater has been credited for its intimacy and lack of nosebleed seats – no seat in the auditorium is more than 60 feet away from the stage's proscenium arch. Of the 755 seats, 585 are ground-level orchestra seats while 170 are balcony seats. Its proscenium is 24 feet (7.3 m) tall and 40.5 feet (12.3 m) wide with a dark crimson velour front curtain.
