= Barclay, Nevada =

Unincorporated community located in the State of Nevada, United States

- Unincorporated community
- Location within Nevada Location within the United States
- Coordinates: 37°30′48″N 114°15′06″W
- Country: United States
- State: Nevada
- County: Lincoln
- Elevation: 5,354 ft (1,632 m)
- Time zone: UTC-8 (PST)
  - Summer (DST): UTC-7 (PDT)
- GNIS feature ID: 858313
- Other names: Clover Valley; Clover Valley Junction

Barclay is a town in Lincoln County, Nevada, United States. Originally a Mormon settlement in the late 1860s, it has few residents and appears on several ghost town lists. The Barclay post office closed in 1910. Main sites in the town include an old Mormon cemetery, and an abandoned Post Office, the latter being one of the few remaining buildings in the town.

The National Mustang Association owns a ranch in the area that serves as a sanctuary for wild horses.
