= Strongback (girder) =

A strongback is a beam or girder which acts as a secondary support member to an existing structure. A strongback in a staircase is usually ordinary two-by (e.g. 50 mm by something) dimensional lumber attached to the staircase stringers to stiffen the assembly. In shipbuilding, a strongback, known as a waler is oriented lengthwise along a ship to brace across several frames to keep the frames square and plumb. In formwork strongbacks (typically vertical) reinforce typically horizontal walers to provide additional support against hydrostatic pressure during concrete pours.

Some rockets like the Antares, the Falcon 9 and the Falcon Heavy use a strongback to restrain the rocket prior to launch. This structure tilts several degrees away from the rocket to clear the launch, either at the moment of launch or a few minutes before.

== See also ==
- Wall stud
