= Barclay Hotel =

Barclay Hotel may refer to:

- Barclay Hotel (Los Angeles)
- Barclay Hotel (Philadelphia)
- InterContinental New York Barclay Hotel
