= Brad Barkley =

American writer

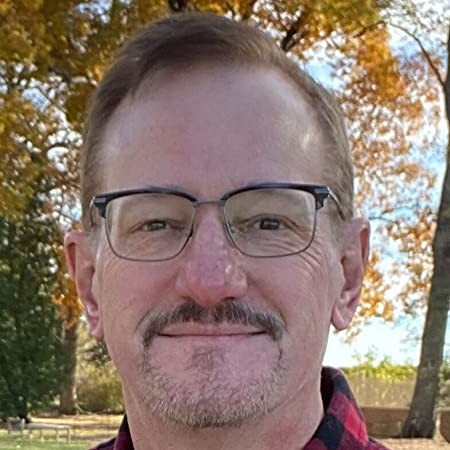
Barkley in 2022.

Brad Barkley, a native of North Carolina, is the author of the novel, Money, Love (Norton), a Barnes and Noble "Discover Great New Writers" selection and a "BookSense 76" choice. Money, Love was named one of the best books of 2000 by the Washington Post and the Library Journal. Brad was named one of the "Breakthrough Writers You Need To Know" by Book Magazine. His novel Alison's Automotive Repair Manual (St. Martin's) was also a "BookSense 76" selection. He has published two collections of short stories, Circle View (SMU Press) and Another Perfect Catastrophe (St. Martin's). His short fiction has appeared in nearly thirty magazines, including Southern Review, Georgia Review, the Oxford American, Glimmer Train, Book Magazine, and the Virginia Quarterly Review, which twice awarded him the Emily Balch Prize for Best Fiction. His work has been anthologized in New Stories from the South: The Year's Best, 2002. His first YA novel, Scrambled Eggs At Midnight, co-authored with Heather Hepler, was published in May 2006 by Penguin, and was a summer 2006 "Booksense 76" choice. His second YA novel, Dream Factory, published in spring 2007, was also "BookSense 76" selection, a Library Guild "Book of the Month, pick" and was voted the Texas Institute of Arts and Letters "Best Young Adult Book" for 2007. Their most recent title, Jars of Glass, was recently published by Dutton-Penguin. He has received four Individual Artist Awards from the Maryland State Arts Council, and a creative writing fellowship from the National Endowment for the Arts. He is the author of the novels Money, Love (Norton) and Alison's Automotive Repair Manual (St. Martins), as well as two short-story collections and three Young Adult novels. His short fiction has appeared in such magazines as Glimmer Train, the Southern Review, and The Oxford American.

== Bibliography ==
- Money, Love: A Novel. W. W. Norton. 2000. ISBN 0-393-04929-9.
- Alison's Automotive Repair Manual St. Martins. 2003. ISBN 0312325797
- Another Perfect Catastrophe and Other Stories. St. Martins-Thomas Dunne. 2004. ISBN 9780312291471
- with Heather Hepler (2006). Scrambled Eggs at Midnight. Dutton Juvenile/Penguin Books. ISBN 0-525-47760-8.
- with Heather Hepler (2008). Jars of Glass. Dutton Juvenile/Penguin Books. ISBN 978-0-525-47911-6.
- with Heather Hepler (2009). Dream Factory. Penguin Books. ISBN 978-0-14-241298-5.

== Books ==
- The Reel Life of Zara Kegg, forthcoming 2026, Regal House Publishing.
- Money, Love (e-book edition). Dzanc Press, 2013.
- Circle View (e-book edition). Dzanc Press, 2013.
- Alison's Automotive Repair Manual (e-book edition). Dzanc Press, 2013.
- Another Perfect Catastrophe (e-book edition). Dzanc Press, 2013.
- Jars of Glass (YA novel, co-author). Dutton/Penguin-Putnam. New York, New York, October 2009.
- Dream Factory (YA novel, co-author). Dutton/Penguin-Putnam. New York, New York, May 2007.
- Scrambled Eggs at Midnight (YA novel, co-author). Dutton/Penguin-Putnam. New York, New York, May 2006.
- Another Perfect Catastrophe (stories). St. Martin's Press. New York, New York, March 2004.
- Alison's Automotive Repair Manual (novel). St. Martin's Press. New York, New York, March 2002.
- Money, Love (novel). W.W. Norton and Co. New York, New York, July 2000.
- Circle View (stories). Southern Methodist University Press, Dallas, Texas, January 1996.

== Books in Translation ==
- Dream Factory (Korean edition). Gasse, Korea, 2009.
- Alison's Automotive Repair Manual (German edition). DTV, Munich Germany, 2004.
- Money, Love (Portuguese edition). Temas e Debate, Portugal, 2006.
- Money, Love (Japanese edition). Shoten Publishing, Tokyo, 2003.
- Money, Love (German edition). DTV, Munich, Germany, September 2002.
