= David Barkley (footballer) =

Australian rules footballer

Personal information
- Full name: David Barkley
- Born: 14 June 1950 (age 76)
- Original team: University Blues
- Height: 189 cm (6 ft 2 in)
- Weight: 88 kg (194 lb)

Playing career^{1}
Years	Club	Games (Goals)
1972 — 1976	Geelong	55 (77)
- ^{1} Playing statistics correct to the end of 1976.

David Barkley (born 14 June 1950) is a former Australian rules footballer who played for Geelong in the Victorian Football League (now known as the Australian Football League).
