= Margaret Barkley =

American politician

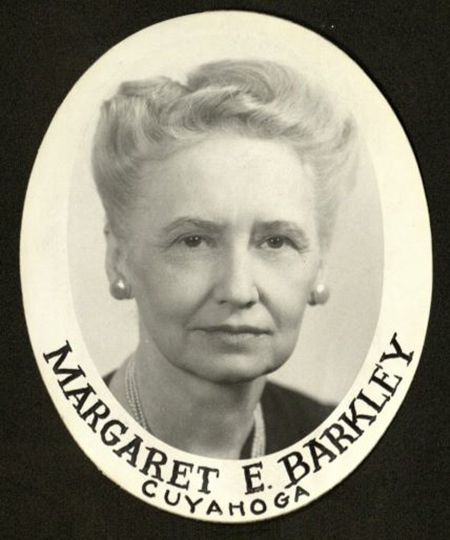

Member of the Ohio House of Representatives from Ohio
- In office January 1, 1946-December 31, 1948

Personal details
- Party: Republican

Margaret Barkley is a former member of the Ohio House of Representatives from Cuyahoga County, United States.
