= Cast-in-place concrete =

Construction technique

Animation depicting construction of multi-story building using aluminum handset formwork.

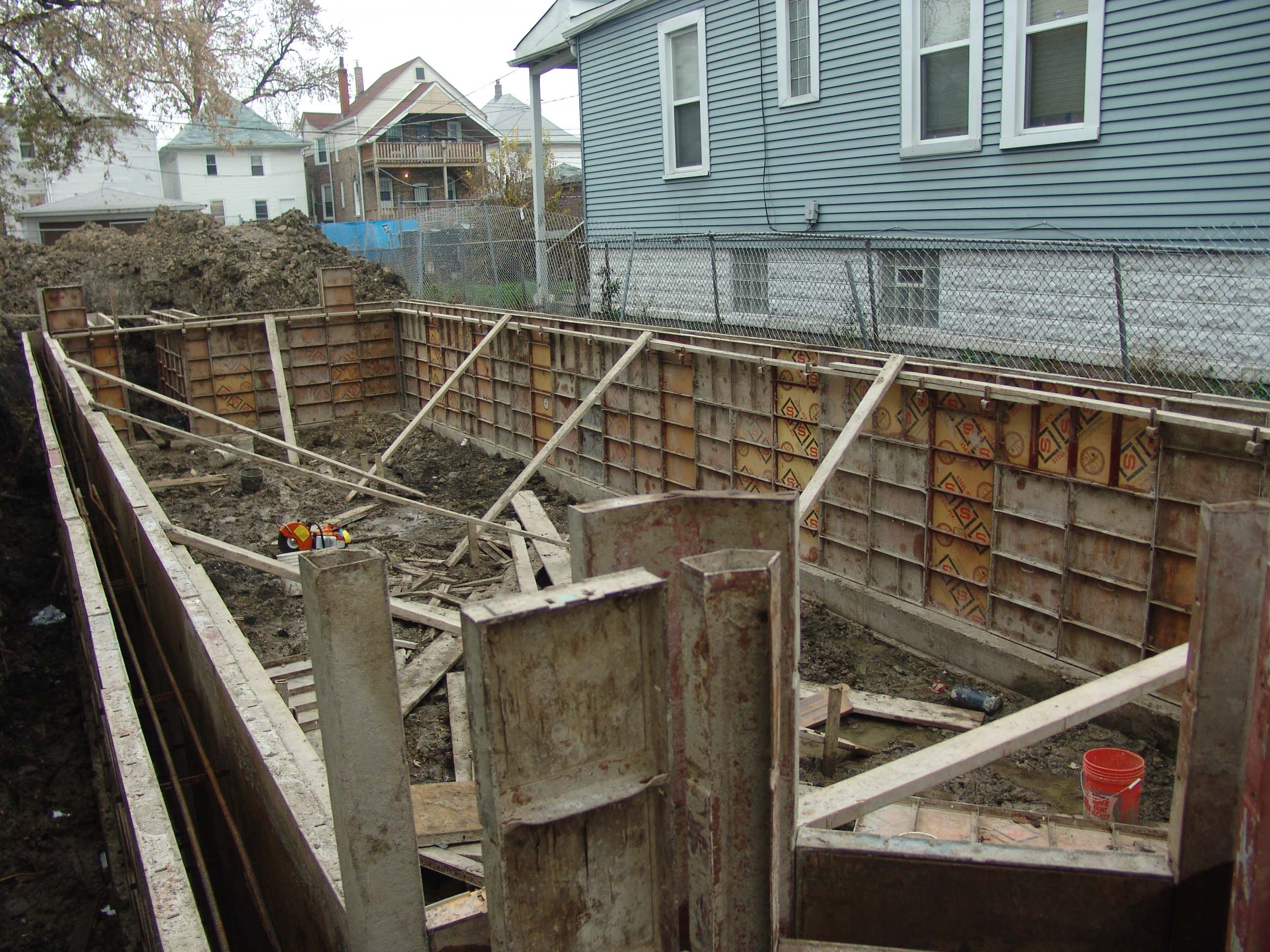
Steel and plywood formwork for poured in place concrete foundation

Cast-in-place concrete or cast-in-situ concrete is a technology of construction of buildings where walls and slabs of the buildings are cast at the site in formwork. This differs from precast concrete technology where slabs are cast elsewhere and then brought to the construction site and assembled. It uses concrete slabs for walls instead of bricks or wooden panels, and formwork is used for both walls and roof.

Advantages of this technology are strength of the building, insulation, and versatility for different types of buildings. A disadvantage is the high amount of labor required to install and remove formwork.

== See also ==
- Precast concrete
- Formwork
