= Barclay (surname) =

Barclay is a Scottish surname (see Clan Barclay). Notable people with the surname include:

- Alexander Barclay (c. 1476–1552), Scottish poet
- Alexander Charles Barclay (1823–1893), English brewer and politician
- Alfred Richard Barclay (1859–1912), New Zealand politician
- Andrew Barclay (disambiguation), several people
- Anthony Barclay, British actor
- Arthur Barclay (1854–1938), Liberian politician
  - Arthur Barclay (disambiguation), several people
- Bruce Barclay (1922–1979), New Zealand politician
- Byrna Barclay (1940–2023), Canadian writer and editor
- Charles Frederick Barclay (1844–1914), American politician from Pennsylvania
- Charles James Barclay (U.S. Navy officer) (1843 – after 1905), American admiral
- Charles James Barclay (banker) (1841–1904), Australian banker
- Charles Malcolm Barclay-Harvey (1890–1969), British politician, governor of South Australia
- Chris Barclay (born 1983), American football player
- Claire Barclay (born 1968), Scottish artist
- Clifford Barclay (1876–1961), Canadian politician
- Colin Barclay (1937–2009), New Zealand cricketer
- Colville Barclay (diplomat) (1869–1929), British diplomat
- Sir Colville Barclay, 14th Baronet (1913–2010), British naval officer, painter and botanist, son of the above
- Curt Barclay (1931–1985), American baseball player
- David Barclay (disambiguation), several people
- Sir David and Frederick Barclay (both born 1934, David died 2021), British businessmen
- Don Barclay (actor) (1892–1975), American actor
- Don Barclay (American football) (born 1989), American football player
- Eddie Barclay (born Édouard Ruault) (1921–2005), French music producer
- Edmund Barclay (1898–1961), English-Australian writer
- Edwin Barclay (1882–1955), Liberian politician
- Emily Barclay (born 1984), New Zealand actress
- Florence L. Barclay (1862–1921), British romance novelist and short story writer
- Frank Barclay (rugby league) (1887–1959), New Zealand rugby player
- Frank Barclay (footballer), Scottish football player
- George Barclay (disambiguation), several people
- Glen Barclay (1888–1959), rugby player
- Henry Vere Barclay (1845–1917), English naval officer and surveyor, explorer in Australia
- Hugh Barclay (disambiguation), several people
- Humphrey Barclay (disambiguation), several people
- James Barclay (born 1965), British fantasy author
- James Turner Barclay (1807–1874), American missionary and explorer of Palestine
- James William Barclay (1832–1907), Scottish businessman, farmer and politician
- Jean-Claude Barclay (born 1942), French tennis player
- Jim Barclay (politician) (1882–1972), New Zealand politician
- Joan Barclay (1914–2002), American actress
- John Barclay, several people
- Joseph Barclay (1831–1881), Irish priest and Anglican bishop in Jerusalem
- Joseph Gurney Barclay (1816–1898), banker and astronomer
- Joseph Gurney Barclay (missionary) (1879–1976), banker and missionary
- Kate Barclay (born 1980), Australian kayaker
- Linwood Barclay (born 1955), Canadian-American humourist, author and columnist
- Liz Barclay, British broadcaster, journalist and writer
- Madeleine Barclay (1911–1943), British World War II Special Operations Executive
- Margaret Barclay (accused witch) (died 1618) Irvine, Ayrshire witch trials
- Mary Barclay (1916–2008), English actress
- Max Barclay, British entomologist and museum curator
- Michael Andreas Barclay de Tolly (1761–1818), Russian field marshal
- Nicholas Barclay American missing person
- Olivia Barclay (1919–2001), British astrologer
- Paris Barclay (born 1956), American television and film director
- Patrick Barclay (1947–2025), Scottish journalist and sportswriter
- Paul Barclay, Australian writer, journalist, radio presenter and producer
- Phyllis Barclay-Smith (1903–1980), British ornithologist
- Robert Barclay, several people
- Barclay baronets, several people
- Sir Roderick Barclay (1909–1996), British diplomat
- Ron Barclay (1914–2003), New Zealand politician
- Sebastián Barclay (born 1978), Argentine footballer
- Shepard Barclay (1847–1925), American jurist from Missouri
- Steve Barclay (racing driver) (born 1944), American race car driver
- Steve Barclay (politician) (born 1972), British politician
- Thomas Barclay (disambiguation), several people
- Vera Barclay (1893–1989), British pioneer of scouting and author
- Violet Barclay (1922–2010), American illustrator
- Wally Barclay (1902–1959), New Zealand cricketer
- Walter Barclay (British Army officer) (1899–1943), British army officer
- William Barclay (disambiguation), several people

== Fictional characters ==
- Andy Barclay, the protagonist in the first three films of the Child's Play series, its 2019 remake and the show Chucky.
- Reginald Barclay, a recurring character in Star Trek: The Next Generation and Star Trek: Voyager
- Bianca Barclay, a siren from the show Wednesday

== See also ==
- Barkley (disambiguation)
- Berkeley (surname)
