= Walter Barclay =

Walter Barclay may refer to:

- Walter Barclay (British Army officer) (Walter Patrick Barclay, 1899–1943)
- Wattie Barclay (Walter Pukauae Barclay, 1894–1985), New Zealand rugby union player, sports administrator and military officer
- Wally Barclay (Walter Sinclair Barclay, 1902–1959), New Zealand cricketer
