= Robert Barclay (disambiguation) =

Robert Barclay (1648–1690) was a Scottish Quaker writer and theologian.

Robert Barclay may also refer to:

- Sir Robert Barclay, 8th Baronet (1755–1839), MP for Newtown, Isle of Wight 1802–1807
- Robert Barclay (British Army officer) (1774–1811), British Army officer
- Robert Heriot Barclay (1786–1837), Royal Navy officer
- Robert Barclay (historiographer) (1833–1876), English ecclesiastical historiographer
- Sir Robert Noton Barclay (1872–1957), English export shipping merchant, banker and Liberal Party politician
- Robert Barclay (statistician) (1901–1973), Scottish statistician and scholar of Orkney
- Bobby Barclay (1906–1969), English footballer

== See also ==
- Robert Berkeley (disambiguation)
- Robert Barclay Allardice (1779–1854), aka Robert Barclay, Scottish sportsman considered one of the founding fathers of pedestrianism
- Robert Barclay Fox (1873–1934), Cornish businessman
- Robert Barclay Academy
- Barclay baronets
- Barclay (surname)
