= Vestiarium Scoticum =

Work by John Sobieski Stuart

The Vestiarium Scoticum (full title, Vestiarium Scoticum: from the Manuscript formerly in the Library of the Scots College at Douay. With an Introduction and Notes, by John Sobieski Stuart) is a book which was first published in 1842 by William Tait of Edinburgh in a limited edition. John Telfer Dunbar, in his seminal work History of Highland Dress, referred to it as "probably the most controversial costume book ever written".

The book itself is purported to be a reproduction, with colour illustrations, of a 15th-century manuscript on the clan tartans of Scottish families. Shortly after its publication it was denounced as a forgery, and the "Stuart" brothers who brought it forth were also denounced as impostors for claiming to be the grandsons of Bonnie Prince Charlie. It is generally accepted today that neither the brothers themselves nor the Vestiarium are what they were purported to be.

Nevertheless, the role of the book in the history of Scottish tartans is immense, with many of the designs and patterns contained therein passing into the realm of "official" clan tartans.

== Background ==
The 1842 edition of the Vestiarium had its beginnings in the late 1820s, when the Sobieski Stuart brothers, then residents of Moray, Scotland, produced a copy of a document containing tartan patterns and showed it to their host, Sir Thomas Dick Lauder. This manuscript, however, was not the one that the brothers claimed to be the basis for the later publication of the Vestiarium.

As explained in the Preface to the 1842 edition (which is extensively excerpted in Dunbar's History of Highland Dress), the copy which Sir Thomas saw, now known as the Cromarty MS, which bore the date 1721 on the first page and with the title Liber Vestiarium Scotia, was said by its possessors to have been obtained from a certain John Ross of Cromarty, and was said also by them to be an inferior copy of an earlier manuscript.

In this same Preface, it is claimed that the 1842 edition is based on an original manuscript, now known as the Douay MS, whose date was claimed to be 1571 (or earlier), which was at that time in the possession of John Lesley, Bishop of Ross. This Douay MS is said by the author of the Preface to be the "oldest and most perfect" copy of the Vestiarium. Having once been in the possession of Bishop Ross, it had found its way subsequently into the library of the Scots College at Douay. From there, it was supposed to have come into the possession of Bonnie Prince Charlie himself, who took over the MS when on a visit to the Scots College in the early 1750s.

== The Lauder–Scott correspondence ==
Soon after Sir Thomas saw the book, he wrote of it to Sir Walter Scott, in a letter dated 1 June 1829. In this letter, Lauder highly commended the book, stating that several clan chiefs, such as Cluny MacPherson and McLeod, had derived their "true and authentic" tartans therefrom. Lauder described the manuscript in detail, stating that he had obtained drawings, in colour, of all of the tartans contained therein (about 66 in number) and sent some of these to Sir Walter Scott himself. In addition to material on tartans, the book also contained appendices on women's tartans (arisaids) and on hose and trews. In the end, Lauder urged the brothers to have the book published and made inquiries concerning costs and procedures to that end. A plan was adopted to publish it, illustrated by swatches of silk in the tartan colours and patterns.

In his reply of 5 June 1829 Scott expressed scepticism over the claims of both the brothers Sobieski and the manuscript itself, at the same time requesting that a copy of the MS be sent for investigation by competent authorities in antiquities. Among other things, he disputed the assertion that Lowlanders had ever worn tartans or plaids, questioned the lack of any corroborating evidence (including any in Bishop Lesley's writings even though Lesley was said to have been in possession at one time of the original upon which the present MS was based), and called into question the authenticity of the brothers. He also noted that the title – Vestiarium Scoticum – was, in his words, "false Latin".

On 20 July 1829 Sir Thomas replied to Sir Walter. In this letter, he describes the (alleged) 1571 original from which the 1721 copy, which he saw, is said to be derived and which was in the possession of the brothers' father in London. Sir Thomas then goes on to discuss the brothers' character, credibility, and society's opinion of them, admitting that the "Quixotism of the two brothers must render these very unfortunate individuals for the introduction of a piece of antiquarian matter to the world…". He nevertheless reasserts his belief in the authenticity of the MS and goes on to discuss the "false Latin" and the presumed use of tartans in the Lowlands.

In a final letter in this exchange from Scott to Lauder, dated 19 November 1829, Scott rejected again the authenticity of the Vestiarium Scoticum and further rejected the notion that Lowlanders ever wore clan tartans. He went further and rejected the entire notion of clan tartans, stating that the "idea of distinguishing the clans by their tartans is but a fashion of modern date…".

== Publication of the Vestiarium Scoticum ==
The Vestiarium was finally published in 1842. A summary of its contents follows.

- Preface, in which is described the origin of the manuscripts, together with observations on the supposed author and date
- Rolls of the Clans
- Introduction
- Text of the Vestiarium
- The setts, stripes, and colours of the tartans, together with a listing of clans and families whose tartans are described
- Colour plates - seventy five plates (in colour) illustrating the tartans of the clans and families mentioned in the previous section

== Tartans ==
The tartans presented in the Vestiarium were divided into two sections. First came the "Highland clans" and this was followed by "Lowland Houses and Border Clans". In the listing below, the clan name (with original spelling as it appeared in the VS) is followed by the Scottish Tartans Society number (TS#) and the (modern) thread count. Please note that these may not be the official clan tartans. For example, the tartan shown for Clan Campbell, known as "Campbell of Argyll", was only worn by the Sixth Duke of Argyll. The standard Campbell tartan is the Black Watch tartan.

=== Hieland clannes (Highland Clans) ===
Plate #	Clan/Tartan Name	Plate	Modern thread count derived from plate	Tartan derived from text	Modern thread count derived from text	Scottish Tartans Society #
1	The Clan Stewart		G4 R60 B8 R8 Bk12 Y2 Bk2 W2 Bk2 G20 R8 Bk2 R2 W2		same as plate	
2	Prince of Rothsay		W4 R64 G4 R6 G4 R8 G32 R8 G32 R8 G4 R6 G4 R64 W2 R2 W4	N/A	N/A (impossible to accurately derive thread count from text)	TS1533
3	Clanne Stewart		R6 W56 Bk6 W6 Bk6 W6 G26 R16 Bk2 R2 W2		same as plate	
4	MakDonnald of ye Ylis		R6 B20 Bk24 G6 Bk2 G2 Bk2 G60 W8	N/A	N/A (fine black lines could be in the blue portion, they are in the green portion in the text)	TS1366
5	Clan Raynald		B10 R4 B30 R4 Bk16 G52 R6 G2 R4 G6 W6		same as plate	
6	Clann Gregour		R128 G36 R10 G16 W4		same as plate	TS866
7	Clan Makduffe		R6 G32 B12 Bk12 R48 Bk4 R8		same as plate	TS1453
8	Makanphersonis		W6 R2 W60 Bk30 W6 Bk18 Y2		same as plate	
9	Clann Grant, or clann Grauntacke		R8 B4 R4 B4 R112 B32 R8 G2 R8 G72 R6 G2 R8		same as plate	
10	Monrois		Bk36 R8 Bk36 R64 W6		same as plate	
11	Clann-Lewid		Bk16 Y2 Bk16 Y24 R2		same as plate	TS1272
12	Clan Campbell		B132 Bk2 B2 Bk2 B6 Bk24 G52 W/Y6 G52 Bk24 B42 Bk2 B8		same as plate	
13	Svtherlande		G12 W4 G48 Bk24 B6 Bk4 B4 Bk4 B24 R2 B2 R6		same as plate	
14	Clanchamron		R8 G24 R8 G24 R64 Y4		same as plate	
15	Clanneil		B12 R2 B40 G12 B12 G48 Bk2 G4 W8		same as plate	
16	Mackfarlan		Bk54 W48 Bk8W48		same as plate	
17	Clanlavchlan		Bk12 Y4 Bk42 Y4 Bk12 Y48 Bk4 Y12		same as plate	
18	Clan-gillean		G12 Bk20 W4 Bk20 G6 Bk8 G60 Bk4		same as plate	
19	Clankenjie		B56 Bk6 B6 Bk6 B6 Bk20 G54 W/R6 G54 Bk20 B56 Bk2 B12		same as plate	
20	Fryjjelis in ye Ayrd		R4 B12 R4 G12 R24 W4		same as plate	
21	Menghes		W4 R40 Cr2 R2 Cr2 R6 Cr10 W48 R6 W4 R2 W8		same as plate	
22	Chyssal		R2 G28 Bk2 G4 Bk2 G4 B14 R56 W2 R12		same as plate	
23	Buchananis		Bk2 W18 Cr8 W4 Cr8 W4		same as plate	
24	Clan Lawmond		B50 Bk2 B2 Bk2 B4 Bk28 G60 W8 G60 Bk28 B32 Bk2 B6		same as plate	
25	Clann Dowgall of Lorne		R8 G18 Bk12 Cr16 R10 G4 R4 G4 R52 G2 R6		P8 G16 B12 P16 R12 G4 R4 G4 R48 G2 R6 (plate colour differs from that listed in text)	
26	Makyntryris		G10 B26 R6 B26 G64 W10		same as plate	
27	Clandonoquhay		G2 R68 B16 R4 G40 R4		same as plate	TS889
28	Maknabbis		G14 R4 Cr4 G8 Cr4 R24 Bk2		same as plate	
29	Clannkynnon		Bk2 R36 G24 R4 G24 R36 W2		same as plate	
30	Makyntosche		R6 G32 Bk24 R56 W4 R10		same as plate	
31	Clanhiunla, or Farquharsonnes		B56 Bk6 B6 Bk6 B6 G54 R/Y6 G54 Bk20 B56 Bk2 B12		same as plate	
32	Clanngvn		G4 Bk32 G4 Bk32 G60 R4		same as plate	
33	Clan-mak-Arthovr		Bk64 G12 Bk24 G60 Y6		same as plate	
34	Clanmorgan		B8 Bk24 B8 Bk24 B64 R4		same as plate	
35	Makqwhenis		Bk4 R14 Bk4 R14 Bk28 Y2		same as plate	TS1209

=== Low country parties (Lowland Clans) ===
Plate #	Clan/Tartan Name	Plate	Modern thread count derived from plate	Tartan derived from text	Modern thread count derived from text	Scottish Tartans Society #
37	Bruiss		W8 R56 G14 R12 G38 R10 G38 R12 G14 R56 Y8		same as plate	TS1848
38	Dowglass		Bk30 Gy2 Bk2 Gy2 Bk14 Gy28 Bk2 Gy4		same as plate	TS1127
39	Crawfovrd		R6 G24 R6 G24 R60 W4		Cr12 W4 Cr60 G24 Cr6 G24 Cr6 (plate shows scarlet, where text shows crimson)	TS1515
40	Ruthwen		R4 G2 R58 B36 G30 W6	N/A	N/A (missing a white line noted in the plate)	TS705
41	Montegomerye		B18 G6 B18 G68		same as plate	
42	Hamyltowne		B10 R2 B10 R16 W2	N/A	N/A (text calls for more than one white line)	TS270
43	Wymmis		R8 Bk24 W2 Bk24 R8 Bk8 R52 G2 R10		same as plate	TS1512
44	Cymyne		Bk4 R54 G8 R4 G8 R8 G18 W2 G18 R8		same as plate	TS1158
45	Seyntcler		G4 R2 G60 Bk32 W2 B32 R4		same as plate	
46	Dvnbarr		R8 Bk2 R56 Bk16 G44 R12		same as plate	
47	Leslye		Bk2 R64 B32 R8 Bk12 Y2 Bk12 R8		same as plate	
48	Lavdere		G6 B16 G6 Bk8 G30 R4		same as plate	
49	Connyngham		Bk8 R2 Bk60 R56 B2 R2 W8		same as plate	
50	Lyndeseye		G50 B4 G4 B4 G4 B20 R60 B4 R6		Cr6 B4 Cr48 B16 G4 B4 G4 B4 G40 (text calls for crimson, as to scarlet in plate)	
51	Haye		R12 G8 Y4 G72 R4 G4 R4 G24 R96 G8 R4 G2 R4 W2		same as plate	
52	Dundass		Bk4 G4 R2 G48 Bk24 B32 Bk8		same as plate	
53	Ogyluye		B58 Y2 B4 Bk32 G52 Bk2 G4 R6	N/A	N/A (yellow stripe would be attached to black)	
54	Olyfavnt		B8 Bk8 B48 G64 W2 G4		same as plate	
55	Setown		G10 W2 G24 R10 B8 R4 Bk8 R64 G2 R4		same as plate	
56	Ramsay		Bk8 W4 Bk56 R60 Bk2 R6		R6 Cr2 R60 Bk56 W4 Bk8 (the two crimson lines in text are rendered black in the plate)	
57	Areskyn		G14 R2 G52 R60 G2 R10		same as plate	
58	Wallas		Bk4 R64 Bk60 Y8		same as plate	
59	Brodye		Bk10 R60 Bk28 Y2 Bk28 R10		same as plate	
60	Barclay		G4 B64 G64 R4		same as plate	
61	Murrawe		B56 Bk6 B6 Bk6 B6 Bk20 G54 R6 G54 Bk20 B56 Bk2 B12		same as plate	
62	Urqwhart		B4 W2 B24 Bk4 B4 Bk4 B8 Bk24 G52 Bk4 G4 R2		same as plate	
63	Rose		G4 R48 B10 R8 B2 R4 B2 R24 W4		G8 R64 P18 Cr12 P4 Cr6 P4 Cr24 W6 (the plate gives a poor representation of the reds & purple)	
64	Colqwohovne		B8 Bk4 B40 W2 Bk18 G58 R8		same as plate	
65	Drymmond		G4 R2 G2 R56 G16 Bk2 G2 Bk2 G36 R2 G2 R8		same as plate	
66	Forbas		R4 G64 Bk36 G10 Bk16 Y4		same as plate	

=== Bordovr clannes (Border Clans) ===
Plate #	Clan/Tartan Name	Plate	Modern thread count derived from plate	Tartan derived from text	Modern thread count derived from text	Scottish Tartans Society #
67	Scott		G8 R6 Bk2 R56 G28 R8 G8 W6 G8 R8		same as plate	TS793
68	Armstrang		G4 Bk2 G58 Bk24 B4 Bk2 B2 Bk2 B26 R6		same as plate	TS793
69	Gordon		B60 Bk2 B2 Bk2 B8 Bk28 G52 Y2 G2 Y4 G2 Y2 G52 Bk28 B40 Bk2 B8		same as plate	TS215
70	Cranstoun		Dg28 B2 Dg2 B2 Dg6 B12 Lg24 R4		same as plate	TS706
71	Graeme		G24 Bk8 G2 Bk8		same as plate	TS786
72	Maxswel		R6 G2 R56 Bk12 R8 G32 R6		same as plate	TS1500
73	Home		B6 G4 B60 Bk20 R2 Bk4 R2 Bk70		same as plate	TS127
74	Johnstoun		Bk4 B4 Bk4 B48 G60 Bk2 G4 Y6		same as plate	TS1063
75	Kerr		G40 Bk2 G4 Bk2 G6 Bk28 R56 K2 R4 K8		same as plate	TS791

== The Quarterly Review ==
In June 1847, a highly critical review of the Vestiarium Scoticum was published in the Quarterly Review. Though the review was initially published anonymously, the authors are now known to have been Professor George Skene of Glasgow University and Rev. Dr Mackay, the editor of the Highland Society's Gaelic Dictionary.

The Quarterly Review article was occasioned by the appearance of a book by John Sobieski and Charles Edward Stuart entitled The Tales of the Century. These stories, although presented in fictional terms, lay out the authors' claims to be direct descendants of Prince Charles Edward, the Young Pretender. The Quarterly Review article, while nominally a response to these claims, in fact mainly consisted of an examination of the authenticity of the Vestiarium Scoticum.

In 1848, John Sobieski Stuart replied to the Quarterly Review article with a treatise of his own entitled The Genuineness of the Vestiarium Scoticum. In this reply, Stuart offered the 1721 edition for inspection. In his part, Skene expressed a desire for the original manuscript, which was said to have once belonged to Bishop Ross, to be exhibited. In the end, no record of anyone examining the 1721 copy at that time exists, and no one, other than the Sobieski Stuart brothers, ever saw the Ross copy.

In 1895, the Glasgow Herald published a series of articles titled "The Vestiarium Scoticum, is it a forgery?" authored by Andrew Ross. Ross was able to locate the 1721 copy, but not any earlier manuscripts. He gave a detailed description of the 1721 copy, and had it subjected to chemical testing by Stevenson Macadam, a chemist. Macadam reported that the "document [bore] evidence of having been treated with chemical agents in order to give the writing a more aged appearance than it is entitled to". He concluded that "the manuscript cannot be depended upon as an ancient document".

This 1721 copy was also presented for examination to a Mr Robert Irvine, the director of a chemical firm who reported that it was "impossible to arrive at any accurate conclusion pointing to the age of the writing".

In earlier years, there was some discussion of publishing a second edition of the Vestiarium Scoticum (the first edition had a press run of only several dozen copies), but nothing came of these discussions.

== See also ==
- Ossian
- Manuscripts of Dvůr Králové and of Zelená Hora
