= Charles Barclay =

Charles Barclay may refer to:

- Charles Barclay (MP) (1780–1855), British brewer, politician and landowner
- Charles Barclay (cricketer) (1837–1910), English cricketer
- Charles James Barclay (admiral) (1843–1909), United States Navy officer
- Charles James Barclay (banker) (1841–1904), Australian banker
- Charles Frederick Barclay (1844–1914), Republican U.S. Representative from the state of Pennsylvania
- Charles Theodore Barclay (1867–1921), English rower
- Charles Barclay, the male lead character in the 1942 film The Gay Sisters, played by George Brent

== See also ==
- Charles Barkley (disambiguation)
