= John Barclay =

John Barclay may refer to:

== Religion ==
- John Barclay (Berean) (1734–1798), Scottish theological writer
- John Barclay (clergyman) (1795–1826), Canadian Church of Scotland clergyman
- John M. G. Barclay (born 1958), theologian and professor

== Sports ==
- John Barclay (cricketer) (born 1954), English/Hong Kong cricketer
- John Barclay (rugby union) (born 1986), Scottish rugby union player

== Others ==
- John Barclay (poet) (1582–1621), Scottish satirist and Latin poet
- John Barclay (anatomist) (1758–1826), Scottish anatomist
- John Barclay, Captain in Danish-Norwegian military, 1643 to 1645, thought to have been the first male member of Clan Barclay
- John Barclay (mayor) (1749–1824), American soldier, politician, and jurist; mayor of Philadelphia in 1791
- John Barclay, survivor of the shipwreck of HMS Birkenhead in 1852
- John Barclay (Royal Marines officer) (1741–1823), British Royal Marines general
- John Barclay (New Jersey politician) (c. 1650–1731), Scottish Quaker and politician

== See also ==
- John Barclay Armstrong (1850–1913), Texas ranger
- John Berkeley (disambiguation)
