= Colville Barclay =

Colville Barclay may refer to:

- Sir Colville Barclay (diplomat) (1869–1929), British envoy to Sweden, Hungary and Portugal
- Sir Colville Barclay, 14th Baronet (1913–2010), British naval officer, painter and botanist, son of the above
