= Frank Barclay =

Frank Barclay may refer to:

- Frank Barclay (rugby league) (1887–1959), New Zealand rugby league player
- Frank Barclay (footballer), Scottish association football player
