= Imperial Dictionary =

The Imperial Dictionary may be:

- The Imperial Dictionary of the English Language (Ogilvie, 1855; Annandale, 1882), or Webster's Imperial Dictionary based on it
- The Kangxi Dictionary of Chinese (17th century)
- Imperial Dictionary of Universal Biography (1863)
