= James Paull (MP) =

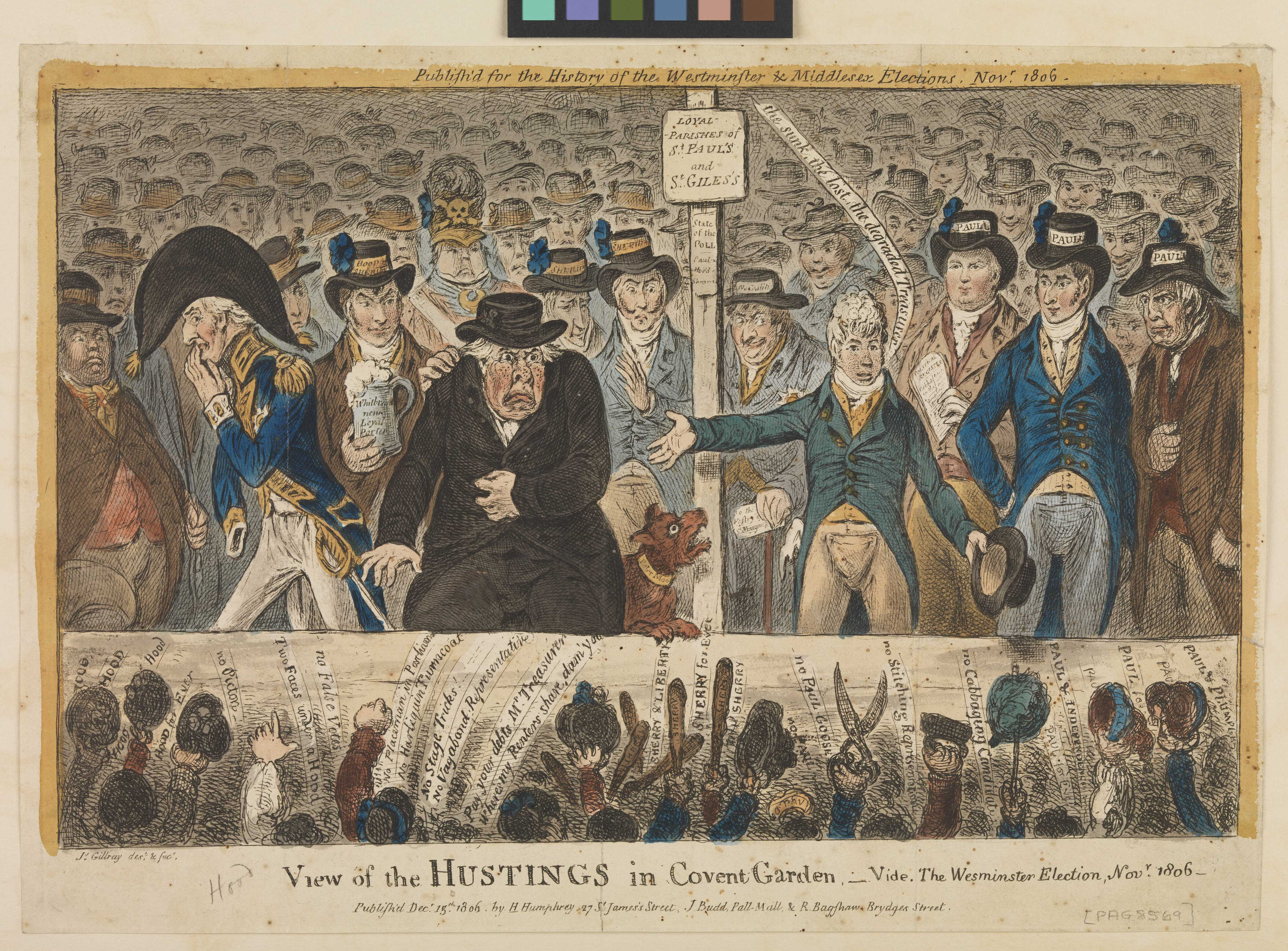
Paull (wearing green coat) at the November 1806 hustings for the seat of Westminster

James Paull (1770–1808) was a British politician and duellist.

== Early life ==
Born at Perth, Scotland, he was the son of a tailor and clothier. He was educated at the University of St Andrews, and placed with a writer to the signet at Edinburgh. At the age of 18 he went out as a writer to India, in the ship of Sir Home Popham, and about 1790 settled at Lucknow. Within two years from his arrival he was able to provide an annuity for his mother, then a widow. Paull was involved in a duel with Michael George Prendergast in 1795; he was wounded, and in later life lost the use of his right arm. In 1801 he left Lucknow and came back to England for a time, but returned again to India the following year.

Prominent in commercial life at Lucknow, Paull was sent to Lord Wellesley as a delegate of its traders. For a time they were on good terms, but they soon quarrelled. The rift almost led to a duel between Paull and Wellesley's friend Thomas Sydenham.

== In Parliament ==
In the latter part of 1804 Paull returned to England with the reputation of a nabob. He was a follower of the Prince of Wales; he was elected Member of Parliament for the borough of Newtown, Isle of Wight, on 5 June 1805, and before the month was out proceeded to move for papers relating to the dealings of Lord Wellesley with the Nawab of Awadh. He had many friends, among whom was William Windham, who introduced him to William Cobbett in June 1805. It was understood at that time that he was supported by the Whigs and the Prince; but when the Ministry of All the Talents was formed, it was impossible for the new government, which included Lord Grenville, to support him in his opposition to Wellesley, although Fox, Windham, and many of its leading members were in agreement with his views. The Prince of Wales asked him, through John McMahon to desist from any further proceedings.

Paull instead spent the session of 1806 in moving for additional papers and in formulating his charges against the viceroy. He supported the parallel campaign against Wellesley by Charles Maclean. The friends of Lord Wellesley tried in July 1806 to force his hand, but, through the interposition of Sir Samuel Romilly, were prevented from carrying out their purpose. Paull widened his parliamentary interests, and succeeded to a limited extent in getting extra-parliamentary support from the direction of the East India Company. But he also touched on other areas, and began to associate with troublemaker MPs, Thomas Jones and Richard Bateman-Robson. A dissolution of parliament then intervened.

== The Westminster election ==
Paull, having been disappointed in his expectation of obtaining a seat for one of the prince's boroughs, stood for Westminster against Sheridan and Sir Samuel Hood (November). The contest was animated. Sir Francis Burdett had met him at Cobbett's, and had introduced him to John Horne Tooke. Burdett had himself been asked to stand for Westminster, but declined in favour of Paull, supporting him with all his influence and subscribing £1,000 towards the expenses of the contest.

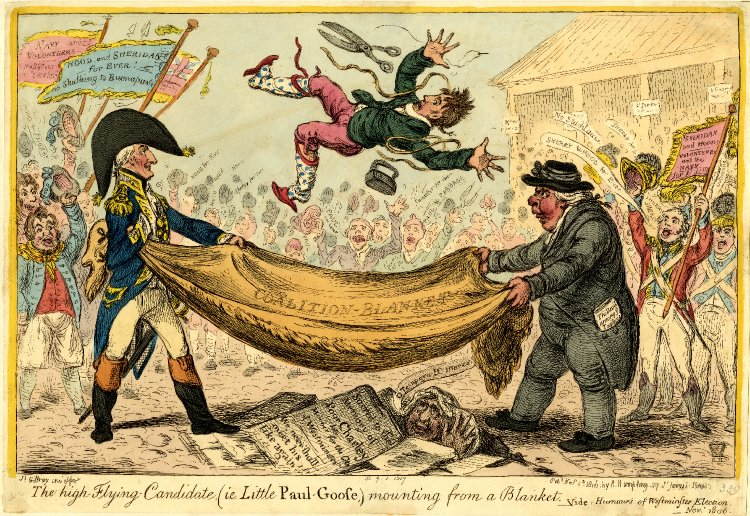
Satirical print by James Gillray, Hood to the left, Sheridan to the right.

The poll lasted fifteen days, when Hood and Sheridan were elected. On one occasion, when the candidates were on the hustings, a stage was brought from Drury Lane, with four tailors seated at work, a live goose, and several cabbages. James Gillray brought out several caricatures, including (1) a view of the hustings in Covent Garden; (2) "the high-flying candidate, little Paull goose, mounting from a blanket" held by Hood and Sheridan; (3) "the triumphal procession of little Paull, the tailor, upon his new goose".

The defeated candidate, who polled 4,481 votes, petitioned against the return, and the matter came before the House of Commons on 5 and 18 March 1807, when the allegations were voted "false and scandalous". A duel between Paull and a Westminster politician, called Elliot, was stopped by the authorities at the close of 1806.

== 1807 election ==
Paull stood again for Westminster at the election in May 1807 with even less success. Horne Tooke was now estranged. Cobbett was still his friend and praised him in his Political Register, on 9 May 1807, for the temptations which he had withstood; but the time came when he remarked, "Paull is too fond of the Bond Street set—has too great a desire to live amongst the great".

Burdett had been advertised by Paull as having agreed to take the chair at a dinner at the Crown and Anchor at an early stage in the election proceedings, but he repudiated the alleged engagement, and a duel ensued at Coombe Wood, near Wimbledon, on 2 May 1807. On the second exchange of shots, insisted upon by Paull, as Burdett declined to apologise, both were badly wounded. Gillray produced a caricature of the duel, and some ridicule was expressed over the circumstance that, through the absence of a medical officer and the lack of proper arrangements for carriages, both combatants were brought back to London in the same vehicle.

As a consequence of the duel, Francis Place and his radical supporters switched to backing the wounded Burdett (who did not appear on the hustings). At the close of the election Burdett and Lord Cochrane were at the head of the poll with 5,134 and 3,708 votes respectively, while Paull obtained only 269.

== Death ==
Paull neglected his wounds, and suffered for three months. His election expenses had exhausted his resources, and he was disappointed in his expectations of assistance from India. For some weeks he showed signs of mental derangement. He lost over 1,600 guineas at a gaming-house in Pall Mall on the night of 14 April 1808.

On the following day Paull deliberately attempted suicide, by piercing his right arm, and then by cutting his throat. He died at his house, Charles Street, Westminster, on 15 April 1808, and was buried at St. James's, Piccadilly, on 21 April.

== Correspondence, aftermath ==
In 1806 a "Lover of Consistency", presumed to be Paull himself, published A Letter to the Right Hon. C. J. Fox, on Fox's conduct on the charges against Lord Wellesley. The accusations brought against the Prince of Wales were repelled in 1806 in A Letter to the Earl of Moira. After the duel with Burdett there appeared in The Times a letter from Tooke, which was published separately; and he also issued a pamphlet, entitled A Warning to the Electors of Westminster from Mr. Horne Tooke, alleging that Paull had imposed on him; the accusation was countered in A Refutation of the Calumnies of John Horne Tooke, by James Paull, 1807. In 1808 there came out A Letter from Mr. Paull to Samuel Whitbread, in which he attributed the loss of his election for Westminster to the influence of another politician. His letter to Viscount Folkestone on the impeachment of the Marquis of Wellesley is in Cobbett's Political Register, on 25 October 1806.

The charges against Wellesley were renewed in the House of Commons by Viscount Folkestone on 9 March 1808, but were negatived by 182 votes to 31.

Parliament of the United Kingdom
| Preceded by Charles Chapman; Sir Robert Barclay, Bt | Member of Parliament for Newtown; 1805 – 1806; With: Sir Robert Barclay, Bt | Succeeded by George Canning; Sir Robert Barclay, Bt |
