= John Service (Scottish divine) =

John Service (26 February 1833 – 15 March 1884) was a Scottish divine and author.

== Life ==
John Service, son of John Service, engraver in the calico works of Robert Dalglish, MP, at Lennoxtown, was born at Campsie on 26 February 1833. He received his education at the Campsie parish school, and then entered the calico works as a clerk. At fifteen he was sent to Glasgow University to study for the church. For several years afterwards he was engaged in literary work, editing the ‘Dumbarton Herald’ in 1857, and from 1858 till 1862 he was sub-editor under Patrick Edward Dove of Mackenzie's Imperial Dictionary of Universal Biography. He was ordained in the church of Scotland in 1862, and for ten months performed ministerial work at Hamilton, near Glasgow. Shortly afterwards he spent eighteen months in Australia owing to failure of health. At the end of the period he was inducted to St. John's presbyterian church (May 1866) at Hobart Town in Tasmania.

He returned to Glasgow in May 1870, and in 1871 he became assistant to Charles Strong at Anderston, which position he left on being presented by the Earl of Stair to the parish of Inch, near Stranraer. While there he wrote a novel, which, after running through Good Words under the title of Novantia, was issued in 1875 as Lady Hetty: A Story of Scottish and Australian Life. A volume of sermons and essays, entitled Salvation Here and Hereafter, appeared in 1877, and caused a sensation in Scotland on account of its broad-church views. Service also wrote much in the Glasgow Herald and other newspapers. In 1871 he contributed to the Contemporary Review an article entitled "The Spiritual Theory of Another Life". On 30 April 1877 Glasgow University conferred on Service the degree of DD, and on 19 December 1878 he was appointed minister of the new west-end church at Hyndland, Glasgow, a position he occupied until his death on 15 March 1884.

=== Personal life ===
On 29 April 1859 Service married Jessie, second daughter of James Bayne, teacher of music in Glasgow, by whom he had four sons and two daughters.

== Works ==
A volume of Sermons by Service was published in 1884, with a prefatory notice and portrait of the author. His Prayers for Public Worship appeared in 1885. In 1880 he contributed an essay on Burns to Mr. T. H. Ward's English Poets.
