= Maclean brothers =

Scottish ocean-rowing brothers

Lachlan, Jamie and Ewan Maclean (left to right) aboard Rose Emily in the mid-Pacific, April 2025

The Maclean Brothers - Ewan, Jamie and Lachlan Maclean - are three Scottish ocean rowers and charity fundraisers from Edinburgh. In 2020 they became the first three brothers to row any ocean, and the fastest and youngest trio to row the Atlantic Ocean. In 2025 they rowed non-stop and unsupported across the Pacific Ocean from Peru to Australia in 139 days, the fastest full Pacific crossing by human power and the first by a team from South America to Australia. At 9,750 miles, the Pacific row was the greatest distance rowed in a single non-stop, unsupported expedition. Their expeditions have raised more than £1 million for clean-water projects in Madagascar, largely through The Maclean Foundation, a Scottish charity the family established in 2022. Their memoir of the Pacific crossing, Three Brothers in a Boat, was published by Canongate Books in 2026.

== Background ==
The brothers are the sons of Sheila Maclean and the whisky writer Charles Maclean and grew up in Edinburgh. None of the three had rowed competitively before their first ocean crossing. They are now based in Assynt in the north-west Highlands.

== Atlantic row (2019–2020) ==
Competing as team BROAR (a portmanteau of "brother" and "oar") in the 2019 Talisker Whisky Atlantic Challenge, the brothers left La Gomera in the Canary Islands on 12 December 2019 and reached Antigua on 17 January 2020, finishing third overall. Their time of 35 days, 9 hours and 9 minutes was the fastest by a three-person crew, beating the record of 41 days set in the previous year's race by James Trafford and his sons Hugo and Joe, and they were also the youngest trio and the first three brothers to row an ocean. The row raised more than £205,000 for Children 1st and Feedback Madagascar.

A feature-length documentary about the crossing, Out of Our Depth: Three Brothers in a Boat, directed by Graham Robertson for Glasgow-based Lost Clock Productions, was released on STV Player in May 2025.

== Charity work and The Maclean Foundation ==
In summer 2019, as training for the Atlantic, the brothers rowed about 300 miles up Scotland's west coast over ten days in a campaign they called Whisky for Water, visiting 16 distilleries between Arran and Skye and collecting donated whisky along the way. After the Atlantic crossing the whisky was blended by their father into two limited editions, released in July 2020, which raised around £55,000 and funded eleven boreholes through Feedback Madagascar. A subsequent visit to the boreholes in Madagascar, during which they became ill from contaminated water, led the brothers to focus their fundraising on clean water and set up their own charity.

The Maclean Foundation (SC051703) was registered with the Office of the Scottish Charity Regulator on 25 April 2022 to fund clean water and sanitation, principally through boreholes in Madagascar. It was established by the three brothers with their father. In August 2023 the brothers toured around 120 Scottish distilleries by bicycle and boat in two weeks to launch the foundation within the whisky industry and seek pledges of casks for a series of single cask charity bottlings. The foundation has since released a series of limited-edition single cask whiskies from donated casks, priced so that each bottle sold funds clean water for life for at least one person; by mid-2025 it had funded more than 20 boreholes, each costing around £6,000 and serving about 200 people. It works in partnership with Feedback Madagascar on a four-year programme, Beyond Water, in the rural commune of Ambohimahamasina, aimed at providing safe water to around 40,000 people.

== Pacific row (2025) ==
The brothers set out from Callao, near Lima, Peru, on 12 April 2025 aboard Rose Emily, a carbon-fibre ocean rowing boat which they helped to design and which was named after a sister who died before they were born, aiming to row non-stop and unsupported to Sydney. Deteriorating weather late in the crossing forced them to divert north to Cairns, where they landed on 30 August 2025 after 139 days at sea and 9,750 miles (15,690 km). The crossing was reported as the fastest unsupported, non-stop row across the full Pacific, beating the 159-day solo crossing from Chile to Australia by Fyodor Konyukhov in 2014, and the first by any team from South America to Australia.

During the voyage Lachlan was swept overboard at night in heavy weather and was recovered by his brothers; the crew also dealt with seasickness, injuries, a broken water-maker and a faulty autohelm, and ran short of food in the final days. The row had raised over £700,000 by the time of landing and passed its £1 million target for the clean-water programme in Madagascar in the following weeks.

The row attracted support from a number of public figures. The brothers hosted a series of "virtual dinners" from the boat with guests including Lorraine Kelly, Ben Fogle, Ewan McGregor, Sam Heughan and Flea, and the actor Mark Wahlberg video-called them as they arrived in Cairns and said their story "needs to be seen on screen".

== Publications ==
In January 2026 the brothers signed a deal with Canongate Books for Three Brothers in a Boat, an account of the Pacific crossing, for publication in autumn 2026.

- Maclean, Ewan; Maclean, Jamie; Maclean, Lachlan (2026). Three Brothers in a Boat: A True Story of Adventure and Purpose Rowing the Pacific. Edinburgh: Canongate Books. ISBN 978-1-83726-699-9.

== Recognition ==
The brothers received a Special Recognition award at the 2026 Pride of Scotland Awards for the Pacific row and its fundraising. In 2025 they were named Outstanding Young Talent at the Great London Scot Awards, and in 2026 they received the Sir Mervyn Brown Award, established in 2024 by the British Embassy in Antananarivo, in recognition of the Pacific row and the funds raised for water projects in rural Madagascar.

The communications campaign around the row, run with the Glasgow agency Story Shop, won awards from the Chartered Institute of Public Relations, the Public Relations and Communications Association and PRmoment in 2026.

== See also ==
- Ocean rowing
