= President Barclay =

President Barclay may refer to:

- Arthur Barclay (1854–1938), 15th president of Liberia
- Edwin Barclay (1882–1955), 18th president of Liberia

== See also ==
- Barclay (surname)
