= Robert Berkeley =

Robert Berkeley may refer to:

- Robert Berkeley (cricketer) (1898–1969), high sheriff and cricketer
- Robert de Berkeley, 3rd feudal baron of Berkeley (died 1220)
- Robert Berkeley (MP for Chippenham) (1566–1614), English politician
- Robert Berkeley (judge) (1584–1656), English judge and MP for Worcester
- Robert Berkeley (writer) (1713–1804), English Catholic publicist
- Robert Berkeley (priest) (died 1654), Anglican priest in Ireland

== See also ==
- Robert Barclay (disambiguation)
