= Towie Barclay Castle =

Castle in Aberdeenshire, Scotland

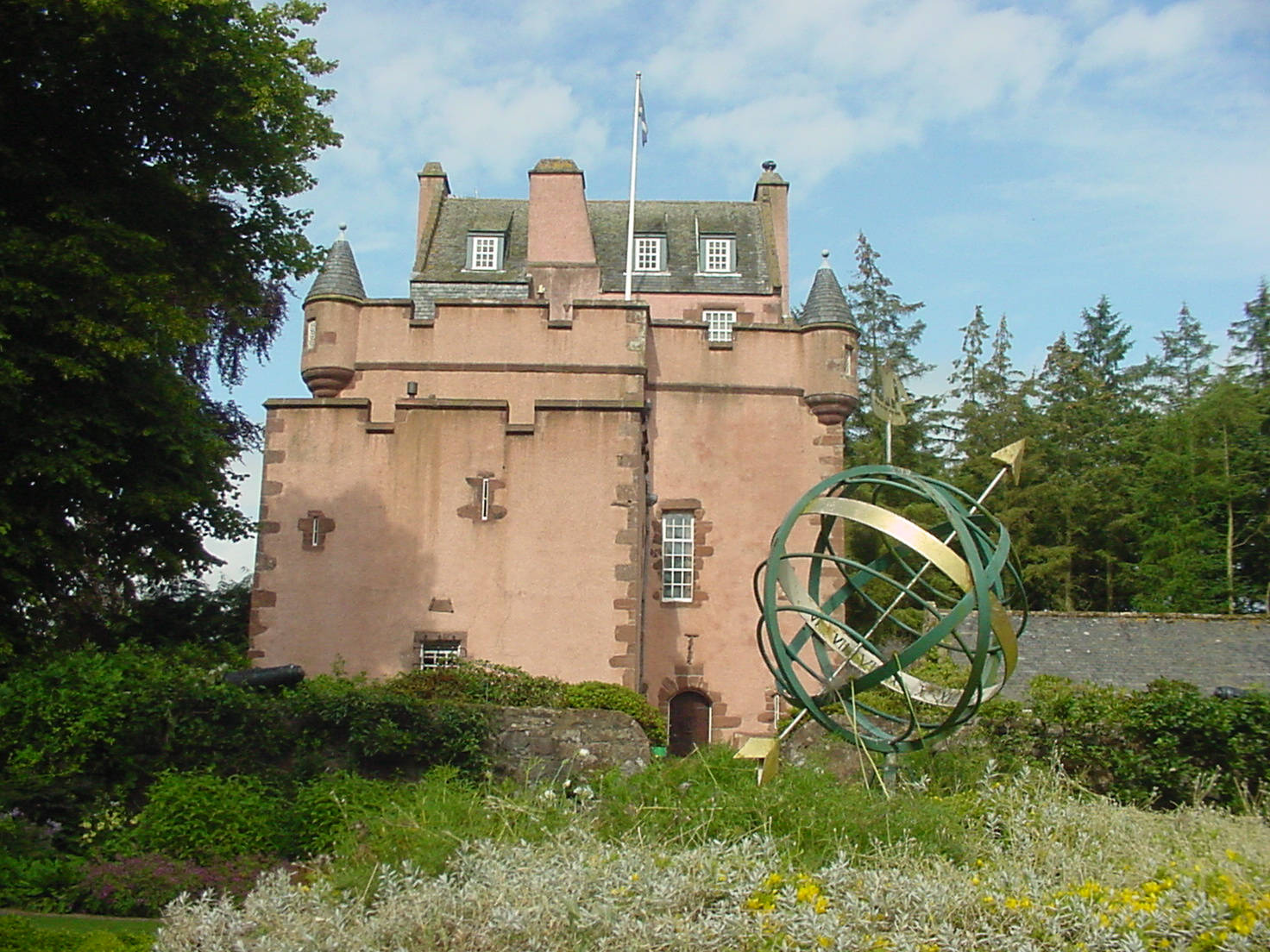
Towie Barclay Castle in 2002

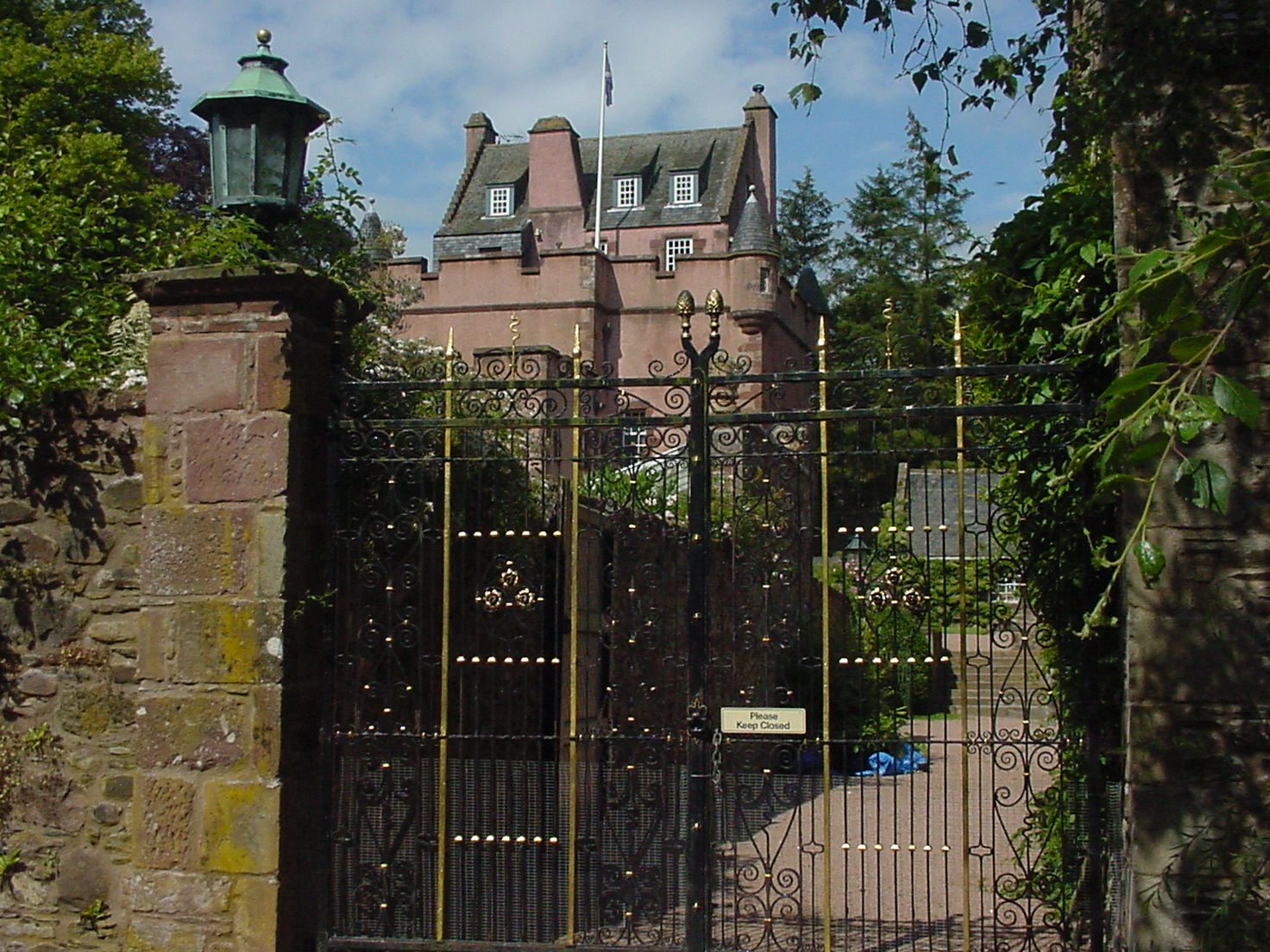
Towie Barclay Castle in 2002

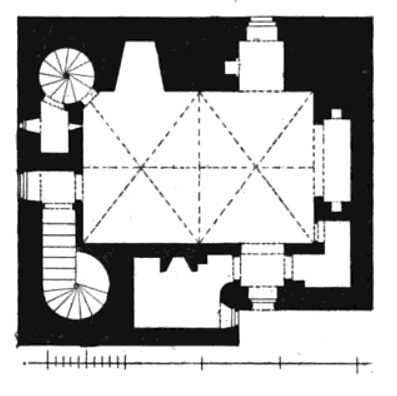
Towie Barclay Castle floor plan drawn in 1887

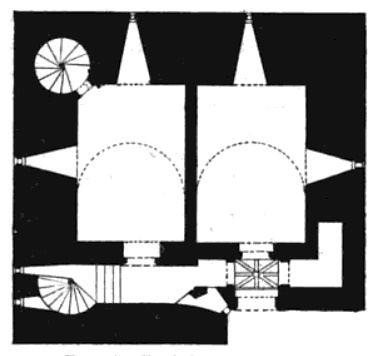
Towie Barclay Castle floor plan drawn in 1887

Towie Barclay Castle is a historic castle in Aberdeenshire, Scotland, 4.5 miles south-south-east of Turriff. The current structure, which was built by Clan Barclay in 1593, is a Category A listed building.

== History ==
The site was given to the Clan in the 11th century by Malcolm III of Scotland. It appears that an early structure was erected in the 12th century as an inscription, built into the wall, reads: "Sir Alexander Barclay of Tolly, foundator, deceisit anno domini 1186." Following Clan Barclay's pillage of a nunnery in the 12th century, Thomas the Rhymer proclaimed: "Towie Barclay of the Glen/Happy to the maids/But never to the men." The present structure was built in rubble masonry and completed in 1593.

On 13 May 1639, during the First Bishops' War, the castle was the scene of the first fatality of the Wars of the Three Kingdoms during the "Trot of Turriff" engagement.

In 1752, Charles Maitland Barclay sold Towie Barclay Castle to James Ogilvy, 5th Earl of Findlater whose family sold it to Robert Gordon's Hospital in Aberdeen in 1792. The turrets and embrasures were removed at that time and the height was reduced by two storeys.

The castle was bought in the late 1960s by the musician Marc Ellington and his wife, Karen. A programme of restoration was funded by Marc Ellington's music career while his wife project-managed the extensive restorative work on the building, which took many years to complete. While the lower story contains sixteenth century masonry, the upper floors are a modern reconstruction. The restoration project was of a sufficiently high standard to win a Saltire Society Award in 1973.

Following Ellington's death in 2021, in 2025 the castle was bought by a wealthy American couple, James Burba and Robert Hayes.

== Description ==
The layout of the castle is a slight modification of a traditional quadrangular keep. The main hall, which is vaulted in two compartments, is 30 feet (9.1 m) long and 20 feet (6.1 m) wide.

== See also ==
- Restoration of castles in Scotland
