= Roderick Barclay =

British diplomat (1909–1996)

Barclay in 1956.

Sir Roderick Edward Barclay GCVO KCMG (2 February 1909 – 24 October 1996) was a British diplomat who was ambassador to Denmark and Belgium.

== Career ==
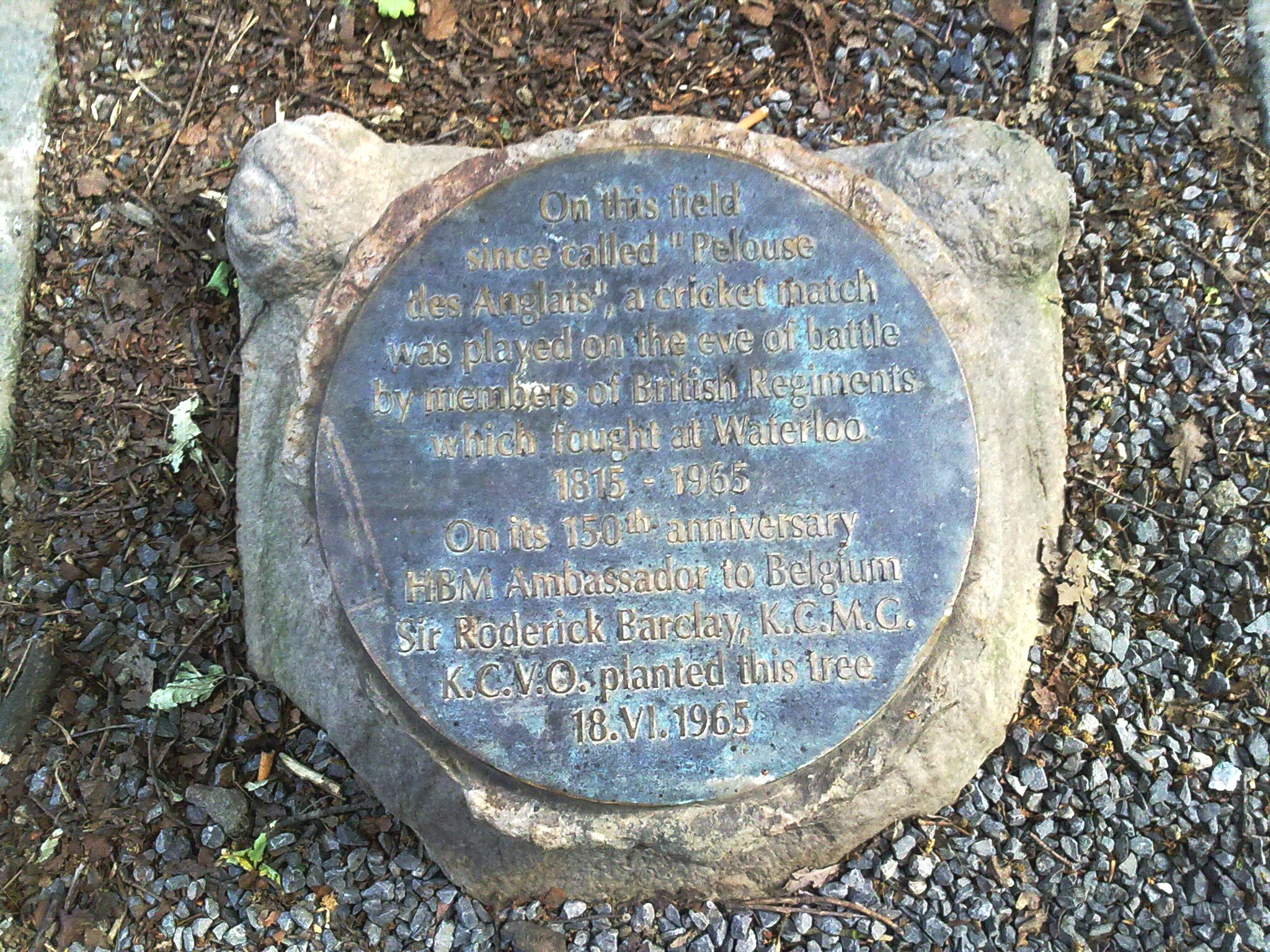
Plaque dedicated by Roderick Barclay to commemorate the cricket game held by English soldiers on the eve of the Battle of Waterloo (1815) on the "Bois de la Cambre" lawn.

Roderick Edward Barclay was educated at Harrow School and Trinity College, Cambridge. He entered the Diplomatic Service in 1932 and served at British embassies at Brussels, Paris, Washington, D.C., and at the Foreign Office as head of the Personnel Department. He was then appointed Principal Private Secretary to the Foreign Secretary, Ernest Bevin, 1949–51.

Barclay was a surprising choice as Bevin's Private Secretary since, at first sight, he and his intended master had nothing in common. ... But in the event he was probably the most successful of the exceptionally able men who served Bevin as Private Secretary.
— Obituary, The Independent, 1 November 1996

After Bevin moved on due to illness in March 1951 (he died shortly afterwards), Barclay served as Assistant Under-Secretary of State at the Foreign Office 1951–53, then Deputy Under-Secretary 1953–56. He was Ambassador to Denmark 1956–60, then returned to the Foreign Office with the rank of Deputy Under-Secretary, as Adviser on European Trade and relations with the newly created European Free Trade Association 1960–63. He took part in Edward Heath's attempt to join the then European Economic Community which, however, was vetoed in 1963 by French President Charles de Gaulle.

Barclay's final diplomatic post was as Ambassador to Belgium, 1963–69. In 1965, to celebrate the 150th anniversary of the Waterloo battle he set up a commemorative "Duchess of Richmond's Ball" and planted a tree in the Bois de la Cambre on the lawn where English soldiers had played cricket on the eve of the Battle.

Sir Roderick (as he had become) retired from the Diplomatic Service in 1969 and became a director of a unit of the family bank, Barclays Bank SA in France, 1969–79 (Chairman 1970–74), also of Barclays Bank International 1971–77, and of Banque de Bruxelles 1971–77. He was also a non-executive director of Slough Estates 1969–84.

== Private life ==
Roderick Barclay was born in 1909 in Kobe, Japan, the son of Joseph Gurney Barclay an Evangelican Anglican-Quaker missionary by his first wife Gillian Mary Birkbeck, who died from complications in childbirth bearing him. His father later remarried Gwendoline Watney, the daughter of a doctor and one of the first women sociology graduates. His half-brother was the Evangelical Anglican missionary Oliver Barclay (d. 2013).

In 1941 he married Jean Cecil Gladstone, only daughter of Sir Hugh Steuart Gladstone of Capenoch, and his wife Cecil Emily Talbot, (d. 1949), a great-granddaughter of Charles Chetwynd-Talbot, 2nd Earl Talbot (father of the 18th Earl of Shrewsbury). Jean Barclay was a kinswoman of the great Victorian statesman William Ewart Gladstone.

Sir Roderick and Lady Barclay had one son and three daughters. Their youngest daughter Davina Cecil Palmer née Barclay is mother of Juliet Palmer, now wife since 1991 of Hugh Cairns, Viscount Garmoyle (b. 1965, eldest son and heir of the 6th Earl Cairns). Her son is in direct succession to the earldom after his father.

Diplomatic posts
Preceded by Sir Frank Roberts	Principal Private Secretary to the Foreign Secretary; 1949–1951	Succeeded by Evelyn Shuckburgh
Preceded by Sir Eric Berthoud	Ambassador Extraordinary and Plenipotentiary to the Kingdom of Denmark; 1956–1960	Succeeded by Sir William Montagu-Pollock
Preceded by Sir John Nicholls	Ambassador Extraordinary and Plenipotentiary at Brussels; 1963–1969	Succeeded by Sir John Beith

== Publications ==
- Ernest Bevin and the Foreign Office 1932–69, self-published, 1975. ISBN 0950455806

== Honours ==
Roderick Barclay was appointed CMG in the 1948 Birthday Honours, CVO in the 1953 Coronation Honours and knighted KCMG in the 1955 Birthday Honours. He was awarded the additional honour of Knight Commander of the Royal Victorian Order (KCVO) in 1957 and promoted to GCVO in 1966. The Danish government awarded him the Grand Cross of the Order of the Dannebrog and the Belgian government awarded him the Grand Cross of the Order of the Crown.
