= Victoria Institute =

Philosophical Society of Great Britain

Victoria Institute of English
- Established: 1865, as "Philosophical Society of Great Britain"; now uses the working name "Faith and Thought"
- President: Sir John T. Houghton
- Location: England
- Website: faithandthought.org

The Victoria Institute, or Philosophical Society of Great Britain, was founded in 1865, as a response to the publication of On the Origin of Species and Essays and Reviews. Its stated objective was to defend "the great truths revealed in Holy Scripture ... against the opposition of Science falsely so called." Although it was not officially opposed to evolution, it attracted a number of scientists sceptical of Darwinism, including John William Dawson and Arnold Guyot.

== Early years ==
The Victoria Institute was established in 1865 by a group of London evangelicals, with the Earl of Shaftesbury as its first president.

Its first honorary secretary, James Reddie, was a staunch critic of Darwinism, which he described as "inharmonious" and "utterly incredible", and Philip Henry Gosse, author of Omphalos, was a vice-president. However, evolution was a relatively minor concern, with much attention being paid to the threat of Biblical criticism.

== Heyday and decline ==
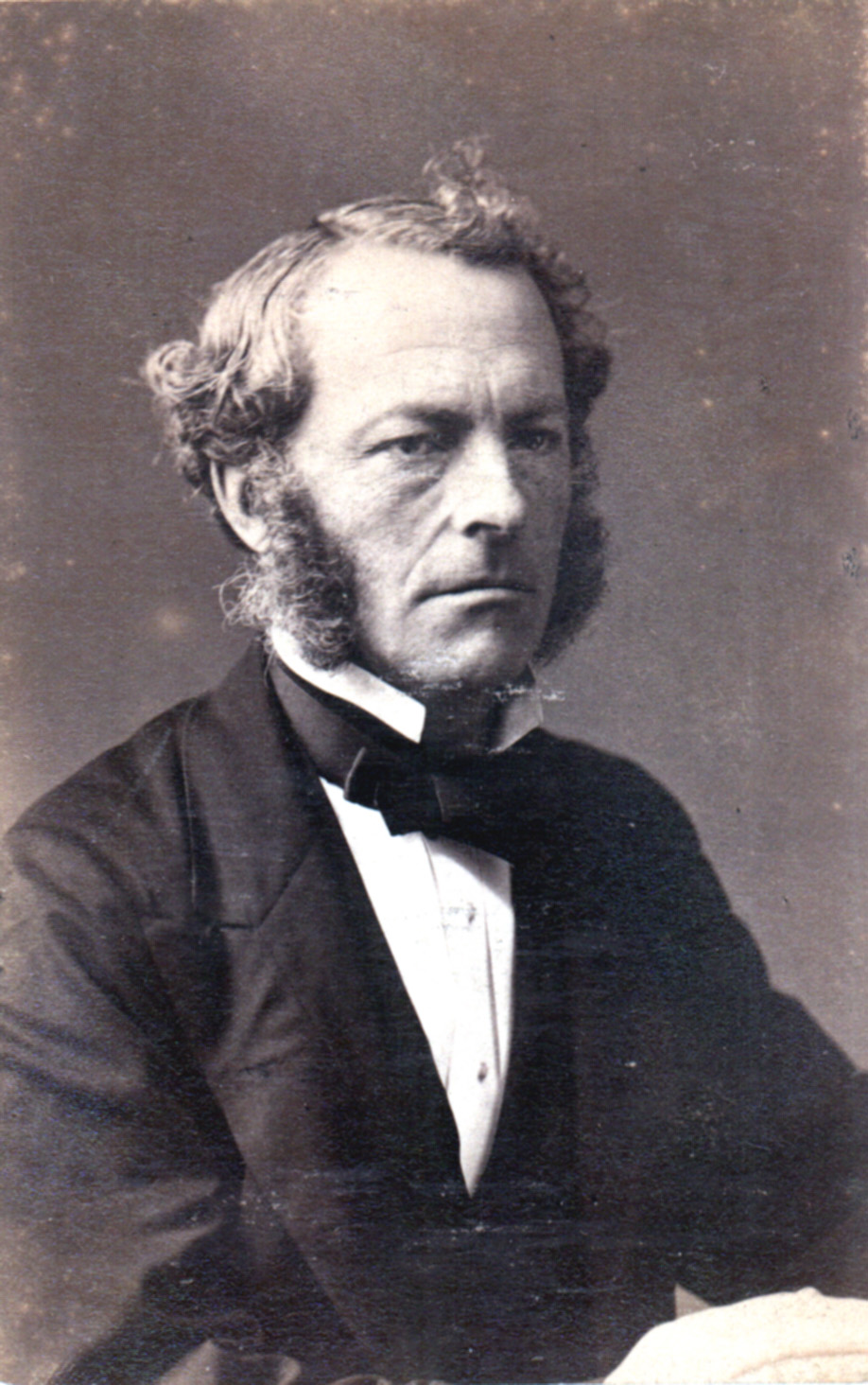
Sir G.G. Stokes

The Victoria Institute enjoyed considerable success in the late nineteenth century, having Sir G. G. Stokes as president from 1886 till his death, whilst President of the Royal Society. Membership reached a high point of 1,246 in 1897, but quickly plummeted to less than one third of that figure in the first two decades of the twentieth century. James Clerk Maxwell was repeatedly invited to join the institute, including in writing in 1875, but, although he was a devout evangelical Christian, he turned down the invitations, due to the institute's narrow outlook and conservatism. Only a few prominent scientists who were Evangelicals joined it.

Prominent Canadian creationist (and long-standing institute member) George McCready Price, attended meetings regularly while living in London between 1924 and 1928, but his views failed to persuade the membership.

In 1927 it appointed prominent electrical engineer and physicist John Ambrose Fleming as its president. He thought himself a creationist and insisted on creation of the soul, but his acceptance of divinely guided development and of Pre-Adamite humanity meant he was thought of as a theistic evolutionist. Fleming's 1935 presidential address, on his views on anthropology and the Bible, provoked commentary from leading London newspapers and a lengthy reply from anatomist and anthropologist Arthur Keith.

The Journal of the Transactions of the Victoria Institute became Faith and Thought in 1958, which, in turn, merged with the Christians in Science Newsletter to become Science and Christian Belief in 1989.

== Current organisation ==
The Victoria Institute currently uses the working name 'Faith and Thought'. Its current president is Professor David Wilkinson. Its current vice-presidents are Sir Colin J. Humphreys and Malcolm Jeeves. In conjunction with Christians in Science, it publishes Science and Christian Belief (into which Faith and Thought was merged) twice yearly. It also publishes Faith & Thought, "Relating advances in knowledge to faith within society" since 2005. This title replaces the Faith and Thought Bulletin, which, in turn, replaced the Faith and Thought Newsletter, which was started in 1985.

== See also ==
- Creation Science Movement
- List of Christian thinkers in science
- Relationship between religion and science
