= Imperial Dictionary of Universal Biography =

19th century biographical dictionary

- Genre: Reference
- Publication date: 1857
- Publication place: United Kingdom

The Imperial Dictionary of Universal Biography was a biographical dictionary of the nineteenth century, published by William Mackenzie in Glasgow.

The second edition, which was published in 1876, was released in two sets. One was a set of 28 volumes (parts), priced at 4 shillings each. The other set was in 14 volumes (divisions), in elegant cloth, bevel boards, cut edges, and priced at 10 shillings each.

== Publication ==
The Dictionary was issued by part publication, and its first edition appeared from 1857 to 1863. In collected form (1863) there were three volumes, originally issued in 16 parts. A later edition appeared from 1876.

== Staff and writers ==
The Imperial Dictionary was edited by John Francis Waller from 1857 to 1866; Patrick Edward Dove was general editor for the first 20 numbers, John Service was on the editorial staff 1858 to 1862, acting as sub-editor under Dove. Also involved editorially were William John Macquorn Rankine, Francis Bowen, John Eadie, and John Pringle Nichol.

A list of contributors appeared in the first volume, and a further list in volume II.

- William Lindsay Alexander
- Archibald Allison
- Joseph Angus
- John Anster
- Thomas Arnold
- William Baird
- John Hutton Balfour
- Hugh Barclay
- Thomas Spencer Baynes
- John Relly Beard,
- Edwin Beedell
- Henry Glassford Bell
- Hugh Blackburn
- John Stuart Blackie
- Francis Bowen
- W. B. Boyce
- David Brewster
- J. H. Browne
- Baroness Blaze de Bury
- John Hill Burton
- William Hookham Carpenter
- J. F. Corkran
- George Lillie Craik
- J. P. Darney
- Samuel Davidson
- Joshua Frederick Denham
- M. Desmarest
- Benjamin Disraeli
- James Donaldson
- J. W. Doran
- Patrick Edward Dove
- John Eadie
- John Edmond
- Karl Elze
- Francis Espinasse,
- Patrick Fairbairn
- James Frederick Ferrier
- William Fleming
- Alexander Campbell Fraser
- Samuel H. Gael
- William Gammell
- Robert Grant
- William Alexander Greenhill
- Felix John Hamel
- James Hamilton
- Robert Harrison
- Eben Norton Horsford
- Mary Howitt
- William Howitt
- William Hughes
- Thomas Jackson
- Robert Kane
- Edwin Lankester
- William Leitch
- Peter Lorimer
- Edmund Law Lushington
- William Maccall
- James M'Cosh
- George Alexander Macfarren.
- John Maclean
- Norman Mcleod
- James Ormiston McWilliam
- Augustus Caesar Marani
- William Allen Miller
- George Moore
- John Daniel Morell
- Thomas Boyles Murray
- John Pringle Nichol
- John Nichol
- C. G. Nicholay
- James O'Dowd
- R. S. Oldham
- John G. Palfrey
- Frederick Penny
- Francis Pulszky
- William John Macquorn Rankine
- Edward Francis Rimbault
- Henry Darwin Rogers
- William Howard Russell
- Aurelio Saffi
- R. Siegfried
- Alexander Smith
- Robert Angus Smith
- J. Storer Smith
- Hugh Stowell
- James Summers
- William Symington
- Isaac Taylor,
- James Taylor.
- James Emerson Tennent
- Robert Dundas Thomson
- Walter Thornbury
- James Thorne
- John Tulloch
- Robert Vaughan
- John Veitch
- John Francis Waller
- John Washington
- Francis Cornelius Webb
- W. Webster
- Charles Richard Weld
- Robert Willis
- Horace Hayman Wilson
- Ralph N. Wornum

Other contributors included:

- John Merry Ross,
- Christina Rossetti on Petrarch, and numerous other Italians
- William Michael Rossetti,
- Algernon Charles Swinburne,

There were engravings included by William Thomas Fry, James Thomson, and Richard Woodman.
