= George Barclay =

George Barclay may refer to:

- George Barclay (Jacobite) (c. 1636–1710), leader of a 1696 plot to assassinate King William III of England
- George Barclay (clergyman) (c. 1779–1857), Baptist minister in Upper Canada
- Sir George Head Barclay (1862–1921), British diplomat
- George Barclay (sportsperson) (1876–1909), American baseball and football player, inventor of the first football helmet
- George T. Barclay (1910–1997), American football player and coach
- George Barclay (RAF officer) (1920–1942), British pilot who was killed in action on the battle of El Alamein; author of Angels 22
- George Barclay (speedway rider) (born 1935), British motorcycle speedway rider and founder of the National Speedway Museum
- George Barclay (MP), English politician
- Pen name of Ronald Kinnoch

== See also ==
- George Barclay Bruce (1821–1908), British civil engineer
