= Oliver Barclay =

Oliver R. Barclay
- Born: 22 February 1919; Kobe, Japan
- Died: 12 September 2013 (aged 94); Leicester, England
- Citizenship: United Kingdom
- Education: Trinity College, Cambridge
- Known for: Conservative evangelical evangelism/activism
- Spouses: Dorothy (m. 1949; died 1964) Daisy (m. 1965)
- Children: 4 (including John M. G. Barclay)

Oliver Rainsford Barclay (22 February 1919 – 12 September 2013) was a British academic and evangelical Christian. Originally a zoologist, he later turned his attentions to widening the influence of conservative evangelical Christianity within universities and theological colleges. He was General Secretary of the Universities and Colleges Christian Fellowship from 1964 to 1980, and also Chair of the International Fellowship of Evangelical Students from 1971 to 1979. In 1989, he co-founded the journal Science and Christian Belief.

== Early life and education ==
Barclay was born on 22 February 1919 in Kobe, Japan. He was a member of the Barclays family; his father was Joseph Gurney Barclay, a CMS missionary, and one of his great-great-grandfathers was Sir Thomas Fowell Buxton, a politician, reformer and brewer. His mother was his father's second wife, Gwendoline Watney, granddaughter of the brewer James Watney.

Barclay was educated at Durnford School, a preparatory school in Dorset, England, and at Gresham's School, then an all-boys private school in Norfolk, England. In 1938, he matriculated into Trinity College, Cambridge to study natural sciences. He graduated with a Bachelor of Arts (BA) degree in 1941. Then a pacifist, he remained at Cambridge to study for a Doctor of Philosophy (PhD) degree in zoology rather than fight in the Second World War. His doctoral supervisor was James Gray, and he completed his PhD in 1944 with a thesis titled "The locomotory mechanisms of lower tetrapods".

== Religious life ==
Barclay converted to Christianity through Frank Houghton, an Anglican missionary with the China Inland Mission. He later developed his conservative evangelical beliefs via the Cambridge Inter-Collegiate Christian Union (CICCU).

Intending on an academic career, Barclay unsuccessfully applied to become a Fellow of Trinity College, Cambridge after his completed his doctorate in 1944. In 1945, he was employed as an assistant secretary of the Inter-Varsity Fellowship of Evangelical Unions (IVF): this was intended as a two-year temporary position, but he would spend his whole career with the organisation. Among his early actions was securing Tyndale House in Cambridge, which had once belonged to the Barclay family, as an independent centre for biblical research. During this time, he also helped found the Research Scientists' Christian Fellowship which grew out of a 1944 conference.

In 1953, Barclay was made the first IVF Universities Secretary, with an aim to lessen the hold of liberal Christianity on university theology departments. Controversy was raised when the Cambridge Inter-Collegiate Christian Union invited Billy Graham, assisted by Barclay's university friend John Stott, to speak at the university in 1955: the opposition accused Graham of bringing fundamentalism into a place for the advancement of learning and modern scholarship. In 1961, he was promoted to deputy general secretary of the IVF.

In 1964, Barclay succeeded Douglas Johnson as General Secretary of the IVF. He also served as chair of the International Fellowship of Evangelical Students (IFES) from 1971 to 1979. Under his leadership, the IVF expanded its reach into polytechnics and further education colleges, and expanded its itinerant evangelists from fourteen in 1965 to forty by 1980. To reflect this expansion, the IVF changed its name to the Universities and Colleges Christian Fellowship (UCCF) in 1975. He retired as general secretary of the UCCF in 1980. He remained active, however, serving as honorary vice-president of IFES from 1983 to 1991 and was co-founder of the Science and Christian Belief academic journal in 1989.

=== Ministry ===
In 1945, Barclay was admitted to the office of Reader by the Bishop of Ely, and exercised a lay preaching ministry in the Church of England. In 1976, when the UCCF moved their headquarters from London to Leicester, he left the Church of England to join Knighton Evangelical Free Church as an elder.

== Personal life ==
On 25 June 1949, Barclay married Dorothy Margaret Somerville Knott (1914–1964), a consultant surgeon. Together they had one daughter and three sons: the youngest son, John M. G. Barclay, became a biblical scholar. Dorothy died of cancer in 1964. On 30 October 1965, Barclay married for a second time to Daisy Emma Hickey (born 1916), a teacher.

Barclay died on 12 September 2013 at his home in Leicester, England; he was aged 94.

== Selected works ==
- Barclay, Oliver R. (1974). Reasons for faith. London: Inter-Varsity Press. ISBN 978-0851103761.
- Barclay, Oliver R. (1977). Whatever happened to the Jesus Lane lot?. Leicester: Inter-Varsity Press. ISBN 978-0851103969.
- Barclay, Oliver R., ed. (1984). Pacifism and War (When Christians Disagree). Leicester: Inter-Varsity Press. ISBN 978-0851107271.
- Barclay, Oliver R. (1985). The intellect and beyond. Grand Rapids, MI: Academie Books. ISBN 978-0310332916.
- Barclay, Oliver R. (1997). Evangelicalism in Britain 1935-1995: a personal sketch. Leicester: Inter-Varsity. ISBN 978-0851111896.
- Barclay, Oliver R.; Horn, Robert M. (2002). From Cambridge to the world: 125 years of student witness. Leicester: Inter-Varsity. ISBN 978-0851114996.
