= James Taylor (Presbyterian minister) =

Scottish minister and historian

Personal details
- Born: 1813
- Died: 1892 (aged 78–79)
- Denomination: (1) New Licht United Secession Church; (2) United Presbyterian Church (Scotland)
- Occupation: Minister

James Taylor (18 March 1813 – 16 March 1892) was a Scottish minister and historian.

== Life ==
Taylor was born in Greenlaw, Berwickshire, on 18 March 1813. After the parish school he went to the University of Edinburgh, and then to the theological hall of the United Secession Church with a view to the ministry. On 29 May 1839 he was ordained minister of the Church in St Andrews. He graduated with an MA from the University of Edinburgh on 20 April 1843.

On 26 February 1846 Taylor was translated to Regent Place Church, Glasgow, and on 11 July 1848, with most of the congregation, he left for the new church erected in Renfield Street. Resigning his charge in 1872, he was appointed secretary to the new Education Board for Scotland; it was closed down in 1885. By then Scotland had popularly-elected educational authorities, an outcome for which Taylor had advocated in synod, in public meetings, and in the lobby of the House of Commons. Benjamin Disraeli alluded to Taylor's persistence in his novel Lothair.

Taylor received a DD from the University of St Andrews in 1849 and an LLD from the University of Edinburgh in 1892. He spent his last years in Edinburgh, writing, and died at Corstorphine, on 16 March 1892.

== Works ==
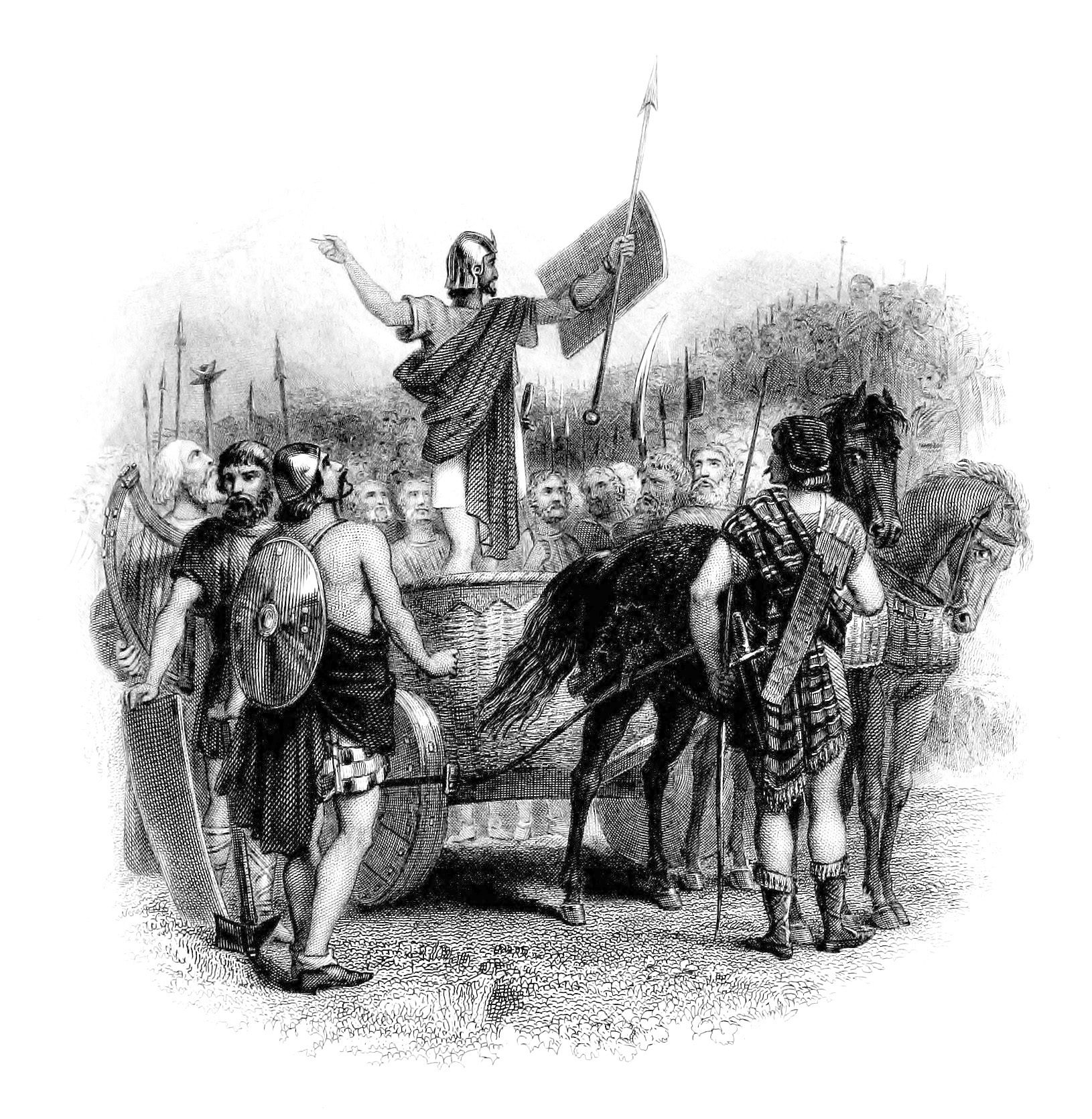
Calgacus, an illustration from The Pictorial History of Scotland by James Taylor

Taylor's published writings:

- The Pictorial History of Scotland, London, 1852–9, 2 vols. enlarged edition, 1884–8, 6 vols.
- The Scottish Covenanters, London, 1881.
- The Age we live in: a History of the Nineteenth Century, Glasgow, 1884.
- Curling, the ancient Scottish Game, Edinburgh, 1884; 2nd ed. 1887.
- The Great Historic Families of Scotland, London, 1887, 2 vols.; 2nd ed. 1891–4.

Taylor also enlarged and continued Patrick Fraser Tytler's History of Scotland, (1845, 1851, 1863); abridged John Kitto's Cyclopædia of Biblical Literature, 1849; and edited The Family History of England, London, 1870–5, 6 vols. He contributed articles to the Encyclopædia Britannica, Imperial Dictionary of Biography, and United Presbyterian Magazine, and published some sermons and pamphlets. The Victorian Empire: a brilliant epoch of our national history (3 vols.) was edited by Taylor and published posthumously in 1897-8; it includes a life of Queen Victoria, essays on Victorian science and on the Indian Empire and other colonial territories.
