= John Berkeley (disambiguation) =

John Berkeley, 1st Baron Berkeley of Stratton (1602–1678) was an English royalist soldier, politician and diplomat.

John Berkeley may also refer to:

- John Berkeley (died 1428) (1352–1428), MP for Hampshire, Gloucestershire, Somerset and Wiltshire
- John Symes Berkeley (1663–1736), member of parliament for the constituency of Gloucestershire
- John Berkeley, 5th Baron Berkeley of Stratton (1697–1773), British politician
- John Berkeley, 3rd Baron Berkeley of Stratton (1663–1697), English admiral
- John Berkeley, 4th Viscount Fitzhardinge (1650–1712), English courtier, treasury official, army officer and Member of Parliament

== See also ==
- John Barclay (disambiguation)
