= William Berkeley =

William Berkeley may refer to:

- William de Berkeley, 1st Marquess of Berkeley (1426–1492), English nobleman
- William Berkeley (MP died 1552), MP for Hereford
- William Berkeley (governor) (1605–1677), colonial governor of Virginia
- William Berkeley (Royal Navy officer) (1639–1666), English naval officer
- William Berkeley, 4th Baron Berkeley of Stratton (died 1741), English politician and judge
- William Berkeley, 1st Earl FitzHardinge (1786–1857), British landowner and politician
- W. R. Berkley (William Robert Berkley, born 1946), founder and chairman of W. R. Berkley Corporation

== See also ==
- William Berkeley Lewis (1784–1866), American civil servant
- William Barclay (disambiguation)
