= Charles Berkeley =

Charles Berkeley may refer to:

- Charles Berkeley, 2nd Viscount Fitzhardinge (1599–1668), English peer
- Charles Berkeley, 1st Earl of Falmouth (1630–1665), English politician and courtier, son of the above
- Charles Berkeley, 2nd Earl of Berkeley (1649–1710), English peer and politician
- Charles Lennox Grenville Berkeley (1809–1896), Member of Parliament for Cheltenham
- Charles Berkeley, 3rd Baron FitzHardinge (1830–1916), British Liberal politician
- Charles Berkeley (bobsleigh) (born 1976), American bobsledder

== See also ==
- Charles Barkley (disambiguation)
