= Thomas Barclay =

Thomas Barclay may refer to:

- Thomas Barclay (scholar) (c. 1570–1632), Scottish jurist, professor at Toulouse and Poitiers
- Thomas Barclay (diplomat) (1728–1793), American merchant, consul, diplomat
- Thomas Henry Barclay (1753–1830), New York lawyer, American loyalist, British official
- Thomas Barclay (minister) (1792–1873), minister in the Church of Scotland and Principal of the University of Glasgow
- Thomas Barclay (missionary) (1849–1935), British missionary to Formosa (Taiwan)
- Thomas Barclay (economic writer) (1853–1941), British Liberal Party MP for Blackburn 1910
- Thomas Swain Barclay (1892–1993), professor of political science at Stanford University
