= Hugh Barclay =

Hugh Barclay may refer to:

- Hugh Barclay of Ladyland (fl. 1592), Scottish Catholic and poet
- Hugh Barclay (lawyer) (1799–1884), Scottish lawyer and sheriff substitute of Perthshire
- Hugh Barclay (architect) (1829–1892), Scottish architect, see Kilmarnock
- Hugh Douglas Barclay (1932–2021), New York State Senator and former United States Ambassador to El Salvador
