= Charles Barkley (disambiguation) =

Charles Barkley (born 1963) is an American former basketball player and sports analyst.

Charles Barkley may also refer to:

- Charles E. Barkley (born 1950), American politician
- Charles William Barkley (1759–1832), English ship captain and fur trader

== See also ==
- Charles Barclay (disambiguation)
- Charles Berkeley (disambiguation)
- Gnarls Barkley, American soul music duo (formed in 2003)
