= William Barclay =

William Barclay may refer to:

- William Barclay (jurist) (1546–1608), Scottish jurist
- William Barclay (writer) (c. 1570–c. 1630), Scottish writer
- William Barclay (painter) (1797–1859), English miniature painter
- William Edward Barclay (1857–1917), football manager of Everton and of Liverpool
- William Barclay (Northern Ireland politician) (1873–1945), Northern Irish Senator
- William Barclay (theologian) (1907–1978), theologian and writer of Bible commentaries
- Willie Barclay (1924-2005), Scottish footballer, see List of Bury F.C. players (1–24 appearances)
- William A. Barclay (born 1969), New York State Assemblyman
- Bill Barclay (died 2001), American athlete and coach

== See also ==
- William Berkeley (disambiguation)
