= Science and Christian Belief =

- Discipline: Philosophy, religious studies, science and religion
- Language: English
- Edited by: Andrew Jackson, Sam McKee, Todd Kantchev

Publication details
- History: 1989–present
- Publisher: Christians in Science and the Victoria Institute (United Kingdom)
- Frequency: Biannually

Standard abbreviations
- ISO 4: Sci. Christ. Belief

Indexing
- ISSN: 0954-4194
- LCCN: 91643099

Links
- Journal homepage; Online archive

Science and Christian Belief is a biannual peer-reviewed academic journal published by Christians in Science and the Victoria Institute. The editors-in-chief are Dr Andrew Jackson (Articles Editor), Sam McKee (Assistant Editor) and Dr Todd Kantchev (Reviews Editor).

The journal was established in 1989, with Oliver Barclay and A. Brian Robins as co-editors-in-chief. It is abstracted and indexed in New Testament Abstracts, Religion Index One: Periodicals, and Religious & Theological Abstracts, and is distributed by EBSCO Information Services as part of Academic Search and other collections. The journal is free to members of Christians in Science.

The Victoria Institute (also known as the Philosophical Society of Great Britain) published the Journal of the Transactions of The Victoria Institute, which was established in 1866; it was renamed Faith and Thought in 1958, and then merged with the (informal) CIS Bulletin in 1989, obtaining its current name, Faith and Thought.
