= Christians in Science =

British organisation

Christians in Science (CiS) is a British organisation of scientists, philosophers, theologians, ministers, teachers, and science students, predominantly evangelical Christians, concerned with the dialogue between Christianity and science. The organisation was started in the 1940s as one of the professional groups of IVF (now UCCF), and was known as the Research Scientists' Christian Fellowship from 1950 until it adopted the current name in 1988.

It took on financial independence from UCCF in 1996. The organisation has over 850 members and includes R. J. Berry and John T. Houghton as two of its more noteworthy members.

Along with the Victoria Institute, it publishes Science and Christian Belief twice yearly.

== Statement of Faith ==
Christians in Science is an "explicitly Christian society", and full membership is open only to those who can affirm the following "Statement of Faith", though it is possible for corporate bodies such as libraries and individuals who do not wish to make the declaration to become associate members.

I declare my belief in the triune God as creator and sustainer of the universe, and my faith in Jesus as Saviour, Lord of all and God.

I acknowledge the Bible as the Word of God and its final authority in matters of faith and conduct.

As a steward of God's world, I accept my responsibility to encourage the use of science and technology for the good of humanity and the environment.

I agree with the aims of Christians in Science.

== Aims of Christians in Science ==
Its aims are:

=== Science and faith ===
To develop and promote biblical Christian views on the nature, scope and limitations of science, and on the changing interactions between science and faith.

To bring biblical Christian thought on scientific issues into the public arena.

=== Faith and the environment ===
To stimulate responsible Christian attitudes and action towards care for the environment.

=== Students ===
To help Christians who are science students to integrate their religious beliefs and their scientific studies.

== See also ==
- Christian Evidence Society
- Victoria Institute
- List of Christian thinkers in science
- Relationship between religion and science
