= Colin Barclay =

New Zealand cricketer

Colin Walter Barclay (21 January 1937 – 8 April 2009) was a New Zealand cricketer. He was a right-handed batsman and a right-arm medium-pace bowler who played for Central Districts. He was born in Wellington.

Barclay made a single first-class appearance, during the 1955–56 season, against Otago. He scored six runs in the only innings in which he batted, and conceded 21 runs from five overs. He later played for Taranaki in the Hawke Cup. He was a member of the Taranaki team that beat Southland to claim the Cup in December 1970 and then held the Cup for two seasons.

His father Wally played for Wellington in the 1920s. Colin's older brother Laurie also played Hawke Cup cricket for Taranaki.
