= George Barclay (clergyman) =

Canadian minister

George Barclay (c. 1779 – 10 August 1857) was a Baptist minister and farmer in Upper Canada.

Barclay was a vocal critic of the Family Compact and, more particularly, their policies. He lost his position of postmaster of Brougham after his loyalty was questioned following the rising of 1837. He was a prosperous farmer and relied on that economic endeavour for the rest of his life.
