= Charles Maclean (writer) =

British medical and political writer

- Occupations: Medical and political writer

Charles Maclean (fl. 1788–1824) was a British medical and political writer

== Life ==
Maclean was educated as a physician, and early entered the service of the East India Company. In 1788 he was surgeon of the William Pitt, and afterwards of the Northumberland and of the Houghton, all East Indiamen, and in this capacity visited Jamaica and made several voyages to India. About 1792 he settled in Bengal, where he had charge of a hospital, apparently at Calcutta, He also served before 1798 as medical officer to troops in Batavia and at Bencoolen. His travels gave him exceptional facilities for the study of fevers, and in 1796 he published the results in a Dissertation on the Source of Epidemic Diseases (Calcutta). In the spring of 1798 he made in an Indian newspaper an insinuation "against a magistrate", which the government resented, and Maclean was ordered by Governor-General Wellesley to leave India. After some resistance he submitted, and was conveyed to Europe in the Mildred.

An intention to visit Spain in 1800 in order to study the fevers prevalent there was frustrated by the war. In 1801 he was at Hamburg, and on the conclusion of peace he proceeded to Amsterdam, Rotterdam, and Paris to advocate an international institution at Constantinople for the study and treatment of the plague. He was one of the prisoners forcibly detained by Napoleon in 1803, but was allowed to leave Bordeaux on 13 December 1803, on proving that he had not visited England for ten years.

In April 1804 Maclean applied for a post on the hospital staff for the British army, and was placed in the York Hospital, Chelsea, where he remained until 15 January 1806, when he was ordered to Chelmsford. His theory that epidemics were not contagious does not seem to have inspired the authorities with much confidence in him, and delay in promotion led him to send in his resignation, which was not accepted. After an unsuccessful application for a post on Sir James Craig's Mediterranean expedition, Maclean left the service, and his name appeared in the Hue and Cry as a deserter. No further steps were taken against him, but he became a bitter opponent of the government. In 1806 he virulently attacked the Marquis of Wellesley in a series of letters, entitled The Affairs of Asia considered in their Effects on the Liberties of Britain, which soon reached a second edition. He was supported in the House of Commons by his friend James Paull.

In 1809 Maclean applied for a post on the Walcheren expedition, naturally without success. Soon after he became lecturer on the diseases of hot climates to the East India Company, and championed the company's cause against the proposals of the government to throw open the trade to India in A View of the Consequences of laying open the Trade to India, 1810. From 1815 to 1817 he travelled in Spain, Turkey, and the Levant, and studied the plague at the Greek Pest Hospital at Constantinople, in the service of the Levant Company. He endeavoured to prove the futility of the quarantine laws, but the government and the College of Physicians, which Maclean charged with a "flagrant abandonment of public duty", refused to adopt his recommendations or repay his expenses. In 1818 Maclean resumed his lectures in England, and projected a series of volumes entitled The Archives of Health, which never appeared. In 1820, in Specimens of Misrule, he attacked the Holy Alliance and Tory government of England. In 1824 he delivered a lecture at Liverpool on the quarantine laws, which was subsequently published. His death probably occurred soon after.

== Other works ==
Maclean's chief works, besides those already mentioned, are:

- An Excursion into France, &c, 1804
- Analytical View of the Medical Department of the British Army, 1810
- Evils of Quarantine Laws, 1818
- Practical Illustrations of the Progress of Medical Advancement during the last Thirty Years, 1818

He was also the author of several pamphlets.
