= Thomas Barclay (scholar) =

Thomas Barclay (c. 1570–1632) was a Scottish jurist, professor at Toulouse and Poitiers.

== Life ==
Barclay was a native of Aberdeen, but as a young man he studied humane letters and philosophy at Bordeaux. Here he gained the support of Robert Balfour, the Aristotelian scholar. He was called to preside over the Collège de l'Esquile at Toulouse, where according to Thomas Dempster, he served his first literary campaign, under Balfour.

It was about 1596 that Dempster left Paris, intending to work his way to Toulouse. Here Barclay concentrated on law; and accepted the offer of a regius professorship at Poitiers. His reputation procured a recall to Toulouse, where he was still living when Dempster drew up his Historia Ecclesiastica about 1620. Dempster states that his lectures on civil law were well attended. He left no written works.
