= John M. G. Barclay =

American New Testament scholar

J. M. G. Barclay FBA
- Born: John Martyn Gurney Barclay; 1958 (age 67–68)
- Relatives: Oliver Barclay (father)

Academic background
- Education: Queens' College, Cambridge

Academic work
- Discipline: Biblical studies
- Sub-discipline: New Testament; Paul the Apostle; history of early Christianity; Hellenistic Judaism; history of the Jews in the Roman Empire
- Institutions: University of Glasgow; University of Durham

John Martyn Gurney Barclay, FBA (born 1958) is a British biblical scholar, historian of early Christianity, and academic. He was the Lightfoot Professor of Divinity at Durham University in Durham, England until 2025 and focuses on the New Testament.

== Early life and education ==
Barclay was born on 31 July 1958 to Oliver and Dorothy Barclay. He is the son of Oliver Barclay, who served as the General Secretary of the Inter-Varsity Fellowship (later the Universities and Colleges Christian Fellowship) from 1964 to 1980. He studied classics and theology at Queens' College, Cambridge, graduating with a Bachelor of Arts (BA) degree in 1981. He then undertook postgraduate research in theology and completed a Doctor of Philosophy (PhD) degree in 1986. His doctoral thesis was titled "Obeying the truth: a study of Paul's exhortation in Galatians 5–6".

== Academic career ==
Barclay's early career was spent at the University of Glasgow, where he was a lecturer from 1984 to 1996, senior lecturer from 1996 to 2000, and professor from 2000 to 2003. In 2003, he was named the successor to James D.G. Dunn as the Lightfoot Professor of Divinity at Durham University.

Barclay has been the President of the British New Testament Society. He is the former editor of the academic journal New Testament Studies (Cambridge University Press).

=== Paul and the Gift ===
One of Barclay's most recent works, Paul and the Gift (Eerdmans, 2015), has drawn considerable praise from scholars around the world. It has been hailed by Markus Bockmuehl and Tim Foster as the most significant book on Paul since E.P. Sanders's Paul and Palestinian Judaism (1977). Douglas Moo has said it is "one of the best books on Pauline theology in the last twenty years." Paul Foster likewise proclaims, "This book will be not only much-discussed in Pauline scholarship, it will be much-prized for the genuine advances it offers in understanding Paul's thought." Paul and the Gift was also reviewed by scholars in popular publications such as Books & Culture and First Things.

One of the insights from Paul and the Gift that led to its very positive reception is the manner in which Barclay develops Paul's theology of grace. By setting this concept in the context of ancient notions of gift, Barclay discerns six key ways in which gift, and thus grace, can be conveyed in Paul: superabundance, singularity, priority, incongruity, efficacy, and non-circularity.

In an interview with Christianity Today, Barclay explains, "So while I disagree with the New Perspective in its sidelining grace within Paul's thought, I agree with its emphasis that Paul was fundamentally concerned with creating new communities that crossed ethnic and social boundaries."

=== Criticism of N. T. Wright ===
Although they maintain a warm relationship, Barclay has been an outspoken critic of N. T. Wright's work on Paul. This has led to several high-profile debates between the two, on 15 June 2016 at New College, Edinburgh University concerning each author's most recent books. They also debated Paul's relationship to the Roman Empire (the 'Paul and Empire' conversation) at the 2007 Society of Biblical Literature Annual Meeting in San Diego. Barclay's plenary speech from this session is now published as a chapter in his book: Pauline Churches and Diaspora Jews (Eerdmans, 2016).

== Selected works ==
- Paul and the Power of Grace. Grand Rapids: Eerdmans, 2020.
- Jews in the Mediterranean Diaspora: From Alexander to Trajan (323 BCE to 117 CE). 2nd ed. Cornerstones. London: T&T Clark, 2018.
- Paul and the Gift. Grand Rapids: Eerdmans, 2015.
- The Last Years of Paul: Essays from the Tarragona Conference. Edited with Puig i Tàrrech and Jörg Frey. WUNT 352. Tübingen: Mohr Siebeck, 2015.
- Pauline Churches and Diaspora Jews. WUNT 275. Tübingen: Mohr Siebeck, 2011. Reprinted, Grand Rapids: Eerdmans, 2016.
- Against Apion. Flavius Josephus: Translation and Commentary 10. Leiden: Brill, 2006.
- Divine and Human Agency in Paul and His Cultural Environment. Edited with Simon Gathercole. LNTS 335. London: T&T Clark, 2006.
- (Ed.) Negotiating Diaspora: Jewish Strategies in the Roman Empire. LSTS 45. London: T&T Clark, 2004.
- Diaspora. Translated by Paolo Bernardini. Introduzione allo studio della Bibbia 17. Brescia: Paideia, 2004.
- Colossians and Philemon. Sheffield Guides. Sheffield: Sheffield Academic Press, 1997. Reprinted, T&T Clark Studies Guides. London: T&T Clark, 2004.
- Early Christian Thought in its Jewish Context. Edited with John Philip McMurdo Sweet. Cambridge: Cambridge University Press, 1996.
- Jews in the Mediterranean Diaspora: From Alexander to Trajan (323 BCE-117 CE). Berkeley: University of California Press, 1996.
- Obeying the Truth: A Study of Paul's Ethics in Galatians. London: T&T Clark, 1988.
