= Humphrey Barclay (disambiguation) =

Humphrey Barclay (born 1941) is a British comedy executive and producer.

Humphrey Barclay may also refer to:

- Humphrey Barclay (priest) (1882–1955), Anglican priest
- H. A. Barclay (Humphrey Albert Barclay, 1858–1947), British soldier

== See also ==
- Humphry Berkeley (1926–1994), British politician
