= Barclay baronets =

Baronetcy in the Baronetage of Nova Scotia

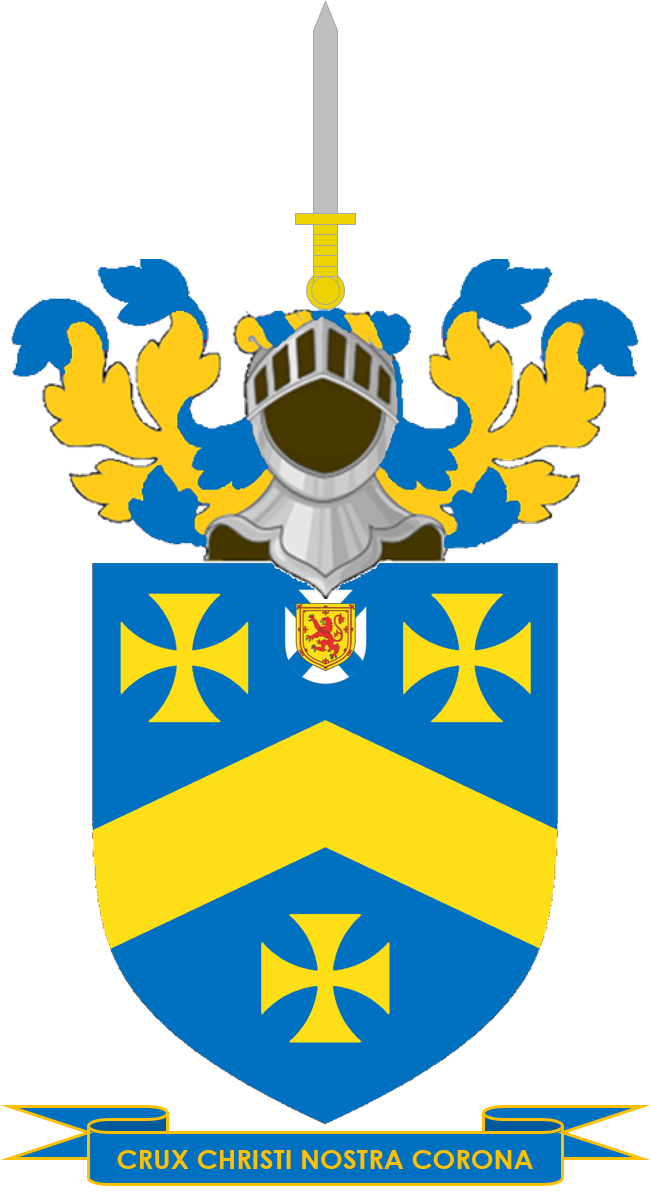
Arms: Azure a Chevron between three Crosses Patée Or; Crest: A Sword erect proper hilted and pommelled Or; Motto: Crux Christi nostra corona (The cross of Christ is our crown)

The Barclay Baronetcy, of Pierston in the County of Ayr, is a title in the Baronetage of Nova Scotia. It was created on 22 October 1668 for Robert Barclay. The eighth Baronet sat as Member of Parliament for Newtown. The eleventh Baronet was a colonial administrator, the twelfth Baronet an army officer, and the fourteenth Baronet a naval officer, painter and botanist. Sir Colville Barclay, third son of the twelfth Baronet and father of the fourteenth Baronet, was a diplomat.

== Barclay baronets, of Pierston (1668) ==
- Sir Robert Barclay, 1st Baronet (died 1694)
- Sir Robert Barclay, 2nd Baronet (1658–1717)
- Sir Robert Barclay, 3rd Baronet (died 1728)
- Sir James Barclay, 4th Baronet (died 1755)
- Sir William Bloyes Barclay, 5th Baronet (c.1710–1756)
- Sir William Barclay, 6th Baronet (1748–1769)
- Sir James Mantle Barclay, 7th Baronet (1750–1793)
- Sir Robert Barclay, 8th Baronet (1755–1839)
- Sir Robert Barclay, 9th Baronet (1819–1859)
- Sir David William Barclay, 10th Baronet (1804–1888)
- Sir Colville Arthur Durell Barclay, CMG 11th Baronet (1829–1896)
- Sir David Edward Durell Barclay, 12th Baronet (1858–1918)
- Sir Robert Cecil de Belzim Barclay, 13th Baronet (1862–1930)
- Sir Colville Herbert Sanford Barclay, 14th Baronet (1913–2010)
- Sir Robert Colraine Barclay, 15th Baronet (born 1950)

The heir apparent is the present holder's son Henry William Saboia Barclay (born 1982).
