= Andrew Barclay =

Andrew Barclay may refer to:

- Andrew Barclay (bookbinder) (1737–1823), who emigrated from Scotland to the British-American colonies
- Andrew Barclay (mathematician) (1849–1943), Scottish mathematician
- Andrew Barclay (merchant) (1719–1775), Scottish-American merchant
- Andrew Whyte Barclay (1817–1884), Scottish physician
- Andrew Barclay Sons & Co., Scottish builder of steam and diesel locomotives
- Andy Barclay, character in Child's Play series
- Andrew Barclay, English actor, writer and producer, known for Brexit: The Uncivil War
