= David Barclay =

David Barclay may refer to:

- Col. David Barclay (Quaker) (1610–1686), 1st Laird of Urie and father of Robert Barclay, the Quaker apologist
- David Barclay of Cheapside (1682–1769), Scottish Quaker merchant, grandson of the 1st Laird of Urie, father of David Barclay of Youngsbury
- David Barclay of Youngsbury (1729–1809), English Quaker merchant and banker, grandson of Robert Barclay
- David Barclay (MP) (1784–1861), English Whig politician
- David Barclay (American politician) (1823–1889), member of the U.S. House of Representatives
- David Barclay (1934–2021), British businessman
- David E. Barclay (born 1948), American historian and author
- David Barclay (puppeteer) (born 1940), British puppeteer
- Dave O'Brien (actor) (1912–1969), who used the pseudonym David Barclay for his film writing and directing work
