= John Barclay (Royal Marines officer) =

British navy officer (1738–1823)

General John Barclay
- Born: 6 April 1738; Cupar, Fife
- Died: November 1823 (aged 85); Taunton, England
- Military career
- Allegiance: United Kingdom
- Branch: Royal Marines
- Service years: 1755–1814
- Rank: General
- Conflicts: Seven Years' War; American Revolutionary War

General John Barclay (6 April 1738 – November 1823) was a senior officer in the Royal Marines during the mid to late eighteenth century.

== Early life ==
According to a handwritten note on his own genealogy, John Barclay was born in Cupar, Fife on 6 April 1738. Local parish records indicate that he was baptised on the same day, and that his father was Oliver Barclay.

== Career ==
Barclay entered the Royal Marines in 1755 as a second lieutenant, and became first lieutenant in 1756. He served throughout the Seven Years' War, at first in the Mediterranean, then in the expedition to Belle Île in 1760, and lastly on the coast of Africa; he was promoted captain in 1762. He served with distinction through the American War of Independence, particularly at the Red Bank and in the mud forts, and was in command of the marines on board the Augusta, when the frigate answered the fire of the forts, and was deserted on being herself set on fire in the Delaware River. For these services he was promoted major by brevet in 1777. He was one of the commanding officers of marines in Rodney's great action with De Grasse, and was after it promoted lieutenant colonel by brevet in 1783.

Barclay saw no further active service at sea, but was for the next thirty years chiefly employed on the staff of the Marines in England. He became major in the Marines in 1791, and lieutenant colonel, and colonel by brevet in 1794. In 1796 he became major general, and in 1798 second colonel commandant in his corps. In this capacity he had much to do with the organisation of the marines, and effected many reforms in their uniform and drill. In 1803 he became lieutenant general and colonel commandant of the marines, and in 1806 resident colonel commandant. He was now practically commander-in-chief of the whole corps under the admiralty, and the universal testimony borne to its good character testifies to the excellence of its organisation, and it must be remembered that not only in the mutinies of Spithead and the Nore, but in all the mutinous manifestations which occurred, the marines proved that they could be depended on to check mutiny among the sailors.

In 1813 he became general, and in 1814 retired from the service after continuous employment for fifty-nine years.

== Family ==
Barclay married Honora Wolrige in Maker, Cornwall, on 30 May 1769. According to a genealogical note handwritten at some point between March and November 1823, they went on to have five children between 1770 and 1781: Honoria Sarah, John Vere Fletcher, Maria (died in infancy), Francis (died at sea aged 14) and Eliza.

In later life the family lived at Taunton. His 'beloved Wife' died there on 8 November 1821, and he followed in November 1823.
