= Charles Barclay (cricketer) =

English cricketer

Personal information
- Born: 2 October 1837; London, England
- Died: 2 January 1910 (aged 72); Bayford Moor, Hertfordshire
- Source: Cricinfo, 8 April 2017

Charles Barclay (2 October 1837 – 2 January 1910) was an English cricketer. He played two first-class matches for Cambridge University Cricket Club between 1859 and 1860. He was educated at Harrow School for whom he played cricket.

== See also ==
- List of Cambridge University Cricket Club players
