= Joseph Gurney Barclay (missionary) =

Joseph Gurney Barclay (9 February 1879 – 15 April 1976) was a British banker and Evangelical Anglican missionary.

Barclay was the fourth son of Robert Barclay of High Leigh and the grandson of Joseph Gurney Barclay, an astronomer. He was born on 9 February 1879 in Hoddesdon, Hertfordshire. His mother was Elizabeth Ellen Buxton, granddaughter of Sir Thomas Fowell Buxton. He was educated at Harrow School and Trinity College, Cambridge. He entered the family bank (Barclay's Bank), but left in 1908 to become a missionary to Japan. He returned to Britain in 1926 to work for the Church Missionary Society.

== Family ==
He married twice. His first wife was Gillian Birbeck whom he married on 25 May 1905 in Freebridge Lynn, Norfolk. She died on 15 May 1909 in Kobe, Japan leaving an infant son Roderick Barclay KCMG (died 1996), who was only three months old, having been born on 22 February previously.

His second wife was Gwendoline Rose Watney (1885-1976) who was already a missionary in Japan with YWCA. She was the daughter of Herbert Watney of Pangbourne, Berkshire, and they were married there on 10 March 1915. Their son Oliver Barclay (1919 – 2013) was a British academic and prominent evangelical Christian.

He died on 15 April 1976 at Troutstream Hall, Rickmansworth, Hertfordshire and his wife Gwen died 11 days later on 26 April. An obituary written by the Bishop of Worcester, Robin Woods was published in The Times.
