= Walter Barclay (British Army officer) =

British Army officer

- Born: Walter Patrick Barclay; 22 August 1899
- Died: 21 May 1943 (aged 43); Tunisia
- Military career
- Allegiance: United Kingdom
- Branch: British Army
- Rank: Lieutenant colonel
- Service number: 183
- Units: Black Watch, 6th Battalion
- Conflicts: World War II: North African campaign; Tunisian campaign †

Lt. Col. Walter Patrick Barclay (22 August 1899 – 21 May 1943) was a British soldier.

== Life and career ==
Barclay was the son of Theodore Charles Barclay and Elizabeth Mary Barclay (née Frazer). He married Daphne Binny in London in 1937.

Barclay was assistant military attaché in Rome in 1938, where his son Peter (who later became leader of Clan Barclay) was born.

During World War II, Barclay served in the Black Watch, reaching the rank of lieutenant colonel. He died in the Tunisian campaign in May 1943.
