= William Barclay (painter) =

English miniature painter (1797–1859)

William Barclay (1797–1859) was an English miniature painter.

Barclay was born in London in 1797. He practised his art both in London and in Paris, and made numerous copies from the works of the Italian masters in the Louvre. He exhibited portraits and some copies in water-colours at the Salon between the years 1831 and 1859, as well as at the Royal Academy between 1832 and 1856.
