= Patrick Edward Dove =

British academic and philosophical writer

Patrick Edward Dove (31 July 1815 – 28 April 1873) was born at Lasswade, near Edinburgh in Scotland. He is mainly remembered for his book The Theory of Human Progression of 1850 which sets out his philosophy that land should be in common ownership, with the economic rent on the land taking the place of other taxes, an idea generally known as Georgism.

== Early life ==
Patrick Dove came from a family of distinguished clergymen and landowners. He was descended from Sir William Dove of Upton, near Peterborough (son of Bishop Thomas Dove). His branch of the family had connections with the Royal Navy going back to 1716 when they moved to Devon where the family still live. His father, Lieutenant Henry Dove RN, retired from active service with the Navy at the end of the Napoleonic Wars in 1815, taking up an appointment at Deal, Kent connected with the Cinque Ports. Edward was educated in England and in France, where he was expelled from the Academy for leading a rebellion against the master. He greatly desired a career in the navy, but his father would not allow this and in 1830 Edward was sent to Scotland to learn farming. Following this he spent time in Paris, in Spain and in London, where he impressed a friend by his "enormous energy, both physical and mental".

In 1841 he took the Craig estate near Ballantrae, Ayrshire, and lived the quiet life of a country gentleman. He was a first-rate horseman, took up fly-fishing and sailing, was an excellent shot and showed mechanical abilities, contributing the article on gunmaking to the 8th edition of Encyclopædia Britannica. As well as becoming an agricultural adviser to neighbouring farmers, during the Scottish potato famine he put his energies into providing work for his starving neighbours. Since he disapproved of the game laws, he had no gamekeeper on his estate to stop poaching.

An unfortunate investment led to him losing most of his fortune in 1848, then in 1849 he married Ann Forrester, daughter of an Edinburgh solicitor. They spent the next year in Darmstadt, Germany, where he continued his interest in philosophy; studying, lecturing and writing.

== The Theory of Human Progression ==
While Dove was still in Darmstadt, his book The Theory of Human Progression, and Natural Probability of a Reign of Justice was published anonymously in 1850 as a limited edition, both in London and Edinburgh. This was to be the first part of a treatise on "a Science of politics", defining science as "nature seen by the reason, and not merely by the senses. Science exists in the mind, and in the mind alone." In it he set out his thesis that "the land produces, according to the law of the Creator, more than the value of the labor expended upon it, and on this account men are willing to pay a rent for the land", this rent being "the profit that God had graciously been pleased to accord to human industry employed in the cultivation of the soil". He saw the land as a gift of the Creator to all men, which should therefore be common rather than private property, but dividing the land into equal shares would be impractical, so the rent should be shared in common, effectively replacing all other taxes.

The book was praised by Thomas Carlyle as the voice of a new revolution in education and economics, and the philosopher Sir William Hamilton spoke of it rallying mankind to great reforms. Charles Sumner had copies made and circulated them in the United States, subsequently persuading Dove to write an article opposing slavery titled The Elder and Younger Brother which appeared in the Boston Commonwealth on 21 September 1853. Despite such praise the book was not a popular success, however some scholarly interest continued. In 1884 Henry George praised the book at a public meeting in Glasgow, and Dove is now seen as a forerunner of the idea known as Georgism.

=== Intelligent design ===
The index and heading to page 476 uses the words Intelligence – intelligent design, and this is now seen as one of the first uses of the term intelligent design which has lately been revived by an anti-evolution movement. However Dove does not discuss biological evolution, though Vestiges of the Natural History of Creation had brought ideas of transmutation of species to public attention in 1844, and uses the term evolution to refer to the development of "a genuine natural theology". He reasons that intuitive perception of a "primordial force" in the works of nature, if only matter is thought to be objective, leads to pantheism, "the theological credence of a large portion of the scientific men on the continent". This appears to refer to the ideas of natural laws put forward by writers such as Auguste Comte which had influenced the inception of Darwin's theory, a theory which would not be made public until 1858. Dove contends that to achieve a "scientific exit" from pantheism the "primordial force" must be perceived as an intelligent agent, then notes that the adaption of matter for the achievement of ends has been called design, a reference to the natural theology of the day.

== Further work ==
Dove moved from Germany back to Edinburgh, where he gave lectures at the Philosophical Institution, the subject in 1853 being Heroes of the Commonwealth. In succeeding years he lectured on The Wild Sports of Scotland and The Crusades. In April 1853 he became captain of the Midlothian Rifle Club, and in 1854 as well as editing the Witness during the illness of a friend, he published the second volume of his treatise, Elements of Political Science. This was followed by Romanism, Rationalism and Protestant in defence of Protestantism. He then wrote the concluding third volume of his treatise which remained unpublished and has been lost.

He published The Logic of the Christian Faith, then in 1858 The Revolver which suggests ideas for rifle clubs and defence of the country as well as lamenting the Highland clearances. That year he moved to Glasgow and edited the Commonwealth newspaper as well as the Imperial Dictionary of Biography and jointly edited the Imperial Journal of the Arts and Sciences. He also wrote the Encyclopædia Britannica article on Government and devised a rifled cannon with advantages in range and accuracy, but was unable to afford further testing which the ordnance committee requested. He took command of the 91st Lanarkshire rifle volunteers in 1859 and in the next year won several prizes at the first meeting of the National Rifle Association at Wimbledon Common, but then suffered a stroke causing paralysis. In May 1862 he went to convalesce in the Colony of Natal, South Africa, returning the following April, then died a year later. By this time slavery in the United States had been abolished.
