= Arthur Barclay (disambiguation) =

Arthur Barclay (1854–1938) was the 15th president of Liberia.

Arthur Barclay also may refer to:

- Arthur Barclay (American politician) (born 1989), American basketball player and politician
- Arthur Kett Barclay (1806–1869), English astronomer

== See also ==
- Arthur Cecil Stuart Barkly, British colonial governor and judge
