= Frank Barclay (footballer) =

Scottish footballer

Personal information
- Position: Inside forward

Youth career
- Nottingham Forest

Senior career*
Years	Team	Apps	(Gls)
1955–56	Dundee United	3	(0)
- * Club domestic league appearances and goals

Frank Barclay is a retired footballer who played as an inside forward. Barclay, who was a youth team player with Nottingham Forest, made three league appearances in the 1955–56 Scottish Second Division season for Dundee United.
