= Wally Barclay =

New Zealand cricketer

Personal information
- Full name: Walter Sinclair Barclay
- Born: 2 May 1902; Waihola, Otago, New Zealand
- Died: 1 December 1959 (aged 57); New Plymouth, Taranaki, New Zealand
- Batting: Right-handed
- Bowling: Right-arm off-spin
- Relatives: Colin Barclay (son)

Domestic team information
- Years: Team
- 1920/21–1925/26: Wellington

Career statistics
Competition	First-class
Matches	10
Runs scored	204
Batting average	22.66
100s/50s	0/1
Top score	67 not out
Balls bowled	695
Wickets	18
Bowling average	17.44
5 wickets in innings	1
10 wickets in match	1
Best bowling	6/65
Catches/stumpings	2/–
- Source: Cricinfo, 25 August 2018

Walter Sinclair Barclay (2 May 1902 – 1 December 1959) was a New Zealand cricketer who played first-class cricket for Wellington from 1921 to 1926.

== Life and career ==
Wally Barclay's family moved from Otago to Wellington when he was a boy. His father had a senior position with the New Zealand Railways Department.

Barclay captained the cricket team at Wellington College in 1919. In 1920, playing his first match of senior club cricket in Wellington for Old Boys, he scored 108. He was the first player to score a century on debut in Wellington senior cricket.

He played for Wellington for some seasons with one outstanding performance, when he took 6 for 65 and 4 for 49 in the victory over Otago in the Plunket Shield in 1921–22. He was selected to play for North Island against South Island at the end of the season, and again contributed substantially to victory, this time by scoring 67 not out in the first innings. Batting at number 10, he went to the wicket with the score at 130 for 8 in reply to South Island's 169, and added 113 for the ninth wicket with Cyril Allcott.

Barclay also played Rugby union for Wellington in the 1920s. He should not be confused with Walter "Wattie" Barclay, who captained the New Zealand Māoris in the 1920s.

At his death after a short illness in 1959, Barclay was district administration officer in the Lands and Survey Department at New Plymouth. He had worked for the department since 1920, except for a period with the Department of Scientific and Industrial Research during the Second World War. He was survived by his wife and their two sons.

His son Colin played first-class cricket for Central Districts in the 1950s. Colin and his brother Laurie also played Hawke Cup cricket for Taranaki.
