= Scottish Tartans Society =

Defunct organisation

Coat of arms of the Scottish Tartans Society.

The Scottish Tartans Society (STS) was a society committed to the recording and preservation of woven tartan designs from around the world; it maintained the Register of All Publicly Known Tartans. The society was first formed in 1963 and existed for about 40 years. The Scottish Tartans Society ceased to record new tartan designs in about the year 2000, having recorded about 2,700 different designs. Today, similar functions are provided by the Scottish government's Scottish Register of Tartans (SRT), which affords some legal recognition to tartans registered with it, and the nonprofit Scottish Tartans Authority (STA), founded by former STS members.

== Creation and activities ==
The Scottish Tartans Society was first formed in 1963, as the Scottish Tartans Information Centre, by several scholars of tartan and Highland dress, with the encouragement of the Lord Lyon King of Arms. The society set out to preserve and record every woven tartan known, including clan tartans and artefacts from several museums and private collections. The society also strove to promote research into Highland dress, and to assist in the designing of new tartans. It was also a recognised charity, under Scots law.

The society's register of tartans was known as the Register of All Publicly Known Tartans (RAPKT). This register was originally a physical collection, consisting of tartans and fabrics. Later, however, the register was eventually transferred to computer in the form of an electronic database. About 2,700 tartans were recorded by the society, categorised as clan or family, district, individual, commemorative, and other. Registration of new designs was not free of charge. STS also (at additional expense and primarily for corporate organisations) hosted rather elaborate "ceremonies of accreditation" for registrants, featuring society members in Highland dress, pipers, presentation of an accreditation scroll, and a prayer. In 1976, the society was accounted as an "Incorporation Noble in the Noblesse of Scotland", being granted a coat of arms by the Lord Lyon King of Arms.

In 1988, the society established the Scottish Tartans Museum and Heritage Center, which has exhibits relating to tartan and Highland dress, in Highlands, North Carolina, United States. In 1994, the museum moved to Franklin, North Carolina, where it still operates as a separate entity. STS also operated a tartan museum in Edinburgh, which closed with the closure of STS itself.

== Splintering and closure ==
In 1996, several members of the society left to create their own organisation, called the Scottish Tartans Authority (STA). The Scottish Tartans Society ran into financial difficulties and ceased to record new tartan designs around the year 2000. The society is now defunct.

== Scottish Tartans World Register ==
Logo of the Scottish Tartans World Register.

The archives of the Scottish Tartans Society were kept, since STS's closure, by the Scottish Tartans World Register (STWR). This organisation was a non-authoritative body formed by a consultant to STS, and aimed to record any tartan, new or old, upon request. STWR was the trading name of a registered company, Tartan Registration Ltd, also a registered Scottish charity.

STWR's database, also called the Scottish Tartans World Register, was based upon the Register of All Publicly Known Tartans, and included about 3,000 tartan designs. The STWR's data has been subsumed into that of the Scottish Register of Tartans (SRT) in Edinburgh, which is the Scottish government's official register of tartans. STWR no longer registers tartans, and directs interested parties to the SRT. STWR ceased operation some time after 2008.
