= Hugh Barclay (lawyer) =

Scottish lawyer

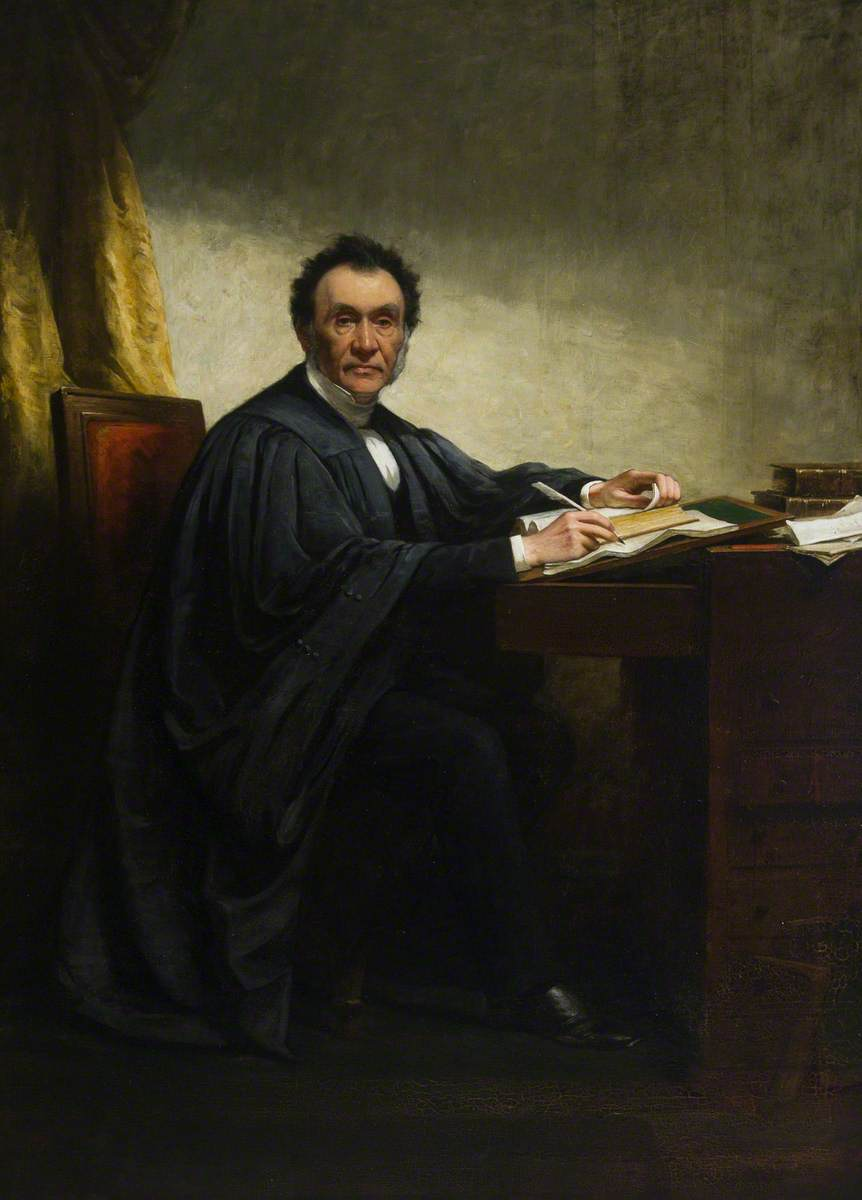
- Hugh Barclay, as illustrated by John MacLaren Barclay c. 1868
- Born: 18 January 1799; Glasgow, Scotland
- Died: 1 February 1884 (aged 85); Craigie, Ayrshire, Scotland
- Occupation: Lawyer

Hugh Barclay (1799–1884) was a Scottish lawyer and sheriff substitute of Perthshire.

Barclay descended from the old Barclay family of Fife, and was born on 18 January 1799 in Glasgow, where his father was a merchant. After serving his apprenticeship as a law agent he was admitted a member of the Glasgow faculty in 1821. In 1829 he was appointed sheriff-substitute of the western district of Perthshire, and in 1833 sheriff-substitute of the county.

Barclay wrote A Digest of the Law of Scotland, with special reference to the Office and Duties of the Justice of the Peace, 1852–3, a work which had several editions. With editions of various other legal works, he also published:

- Law of Highways, 1847
- Public House Statutes, 1862
- Judicial Procedure in Presbyterian Church Courts, 1876;

and shorter works, such as:

- Hints to Legal Students,
- The Local Courts of England and Scotland compared,
- The Outline of the Law of Scotland against Sabbath Profanation.

Barclay was a frequent contributor to the Journal of Jurisprudence and other legal periodicals, and published his papers on the Curiosities of the Game Laws and Curiosities of Legislation in a collected form.

For many years Barclay was a prominent member of the General Assembly of the Church of Scotland, and, taking an active interest in ecclesiastical and philanthropic matters, he published Thoughts on Sabbath Schools, 1855, The Sinaitic Inscriptions, 1866, and some other related works. He died at his residence at Early-bank, Craigie, near Perth, on 1 February 1884, having for several years been the oldest judge in Scotland.
