= Charles James Barclay (banker) =

Australian banker

Charles James Barclay (1841–1904) was an Australian banker. He was also a member of the Royal Society of Tasmania.

Barclay was born in Van Diemen's Land. He helped found the Hobart Saving Bank.

Barclay also served as a justice of the peace.

== Sources ==
- Australian Dictionary of Biography
