= Sir Robert Barclay, 8th Baronet =

Sir Robert Barclay, 8th Baronet (13 September 1755 – 14 August 1839) was Whig MP for Newtown (Isle of Wight) 1802–1806 and 1806–1807.

Baronetage of Nova Scotia
Preceded by James Mantle Barclay	Baronet (of Pierston); 1793–1839	Succeeded by Robert Barclay
