= Sir Colville Barclay, 14th Baronet =

English painter

Sir Colville Herbert Sanford Barclay, 14th Baronet (7 May 1913 – 1 September 2010) was a British naval officer, painter and botanist whose career spanned amphibious landings and commando operations off the coast of France during the Second World War, having his paintings exhibited at the Royal Academy, publishing reference works about the flora of Crete and taking commissions to obtain plant samples from across the world for the Royal Botanic Gardens, Kew.

== Background and education ==
Barclay was born in London, the son of Sir Colville Adrian de Rune Barclay, a diplomat, and Sarita Ward, daughter of the sculptor and explorer Herbert Ward. He attended Eton College and Trinity College, Oxford where he studied PPE, taking courses part-time at the Ruskin School of Art. In 1930 he inherited the Barclay baronetcy after the death of his uncle, Sir Robert Barclay, 13th Baronet.

== Career ==
In 1937 Barclay joined the diplomatic corps before joining the RNVR in 1941 during the Second World War. He was deployed throughout the conflict in small boats operating in commando operations along the French coast, and left the Navy in 1946 as a lieutenant commander. After the war, he took over management of the family's large investment portfolio, which provided enough income for him to be able to focus on his interest in art. Operating from a studio at his home, first in London then in Denham and subsequently Pitshill, near Petworth, West Sussex. Barclay experimented widely with his art and was exhibited at the Royal Academy and in many other places. A number of his artworks were purchased by public galleries, although he had no necessity to sell. It was not until he was in his nineties that Barclay claimed that he had finally been able to paint in the manner he wished.

Aside from his art and business interests, Barclay was a keen botanist, his work focusing initially on the island of Crete. He contributed a chapter to the 1980 guide Flowers of Greece and the Balkans and subsequently published his own work Crete: Checklist of the Vascular Plants in 1986. He collected many plants in the course of his research and as a result was asked by Desmond Meikle to procure samples for the Royal Botanic Gardens, Kew, initially in Turkey but later from many countries around the globe including Nepal with Patrick Synge. Barclay was also an advocate of homeopathic medicine and spent forty years on the board of the Royal Homeopathic Hospital in London.

== Family ==
Barclay married Rosamund Elliott in 1949 and had three children. Following his death on 1 September 2010, his baronetcy passed to his eldest son.

Baronetage of Nova Scotia
Preceded by Robert Cecil de Belzim Barclay	Baronet (of Pierston); 1930–2010	Succeeded by Robert Barclay
