= Colville Barclay (diplomat) =

British diplomat

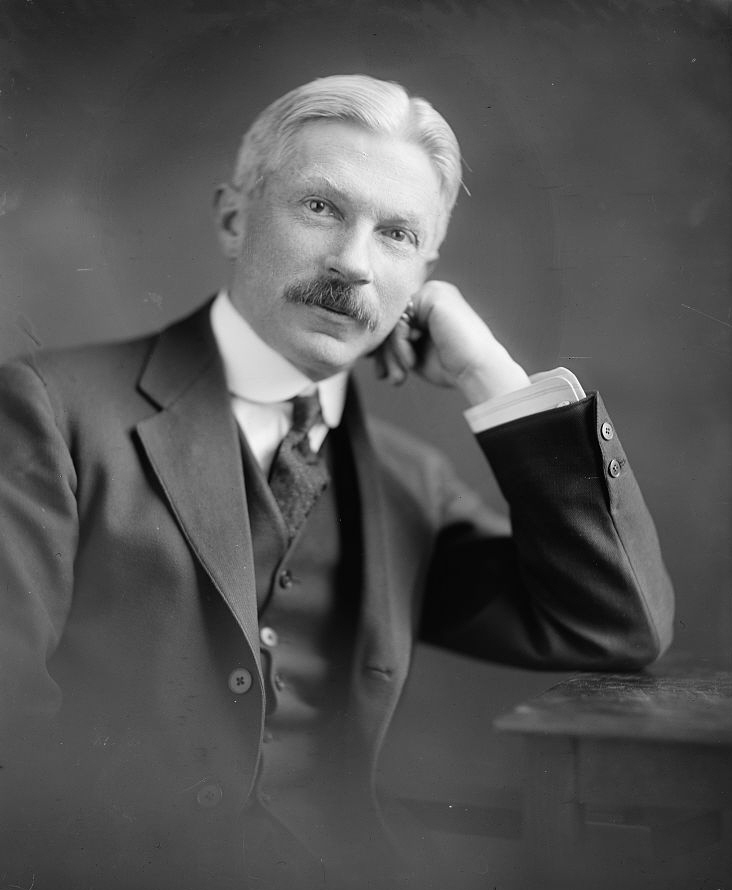
Colville Barclay (Harris & Ewing Collection, Library of Congress)

Sir Colville Adrian de Rune Barclay KCMG CB CBE MVO PC (17 September 1869 – 2 June 1929) was a British diplomat who served as chargé d'affaires in Washington D.C., minister to Sweden and Hungary and ambassador to Portugal.

== Career ==
Barclay entered the Diplomatic Service as an attaché in 1894 and was posted to Vienna. In 1897 he was transferred to the embassy in Paris where for five years he was private secretary to the ambassador, Sir Edmund Monson. He also acted as secretary to the international commission of inquiry into the Dogger Bank incident which met in 1905. From Paris, Barclay was posted to Rio de Janeiro, Bucharest, Sofia and Belgrade before being promoted in 1913 to be Counsellor at the embassy at Washington, D.C. where he remained throughout the First World War; towards the end of the war he was chargé d'affaires in the absence of the ambassador, Lord Reading. After the war he was appointed Minister to Sweden 1919–24, and to Hungary 1924–28. Finally he was appointed ambassador to Portugal in June 1928 but died after an operation in London a year later.

== Honours ==
Colville Barclay was appointed MVO while serving in the British Embassy in Paris in 1903 when King Edward VII visited that city. While Barclay was in Washington he was appointed CBE in 1917 and CB in the 1919 Birthday Honours. He was knighted KCMG in the 1922 New Year Honours and was made a Privy Counsellor in June 1928 on his appointment to Portugal.

== Family ==
Colville Barclay was the third son of Sir Colville Arthur Durell Barclay, 11th Baronet, whose mother came from the French family de Rune. In 1912 he married Sarita Enriqueta Ward, daughter of the sculptor and explorer Herbert Ward; they had three sons, the eldest of whom, Colville Herbert Sanford Barclay, became the 14th baronet in succession to his father's two brothers. Two years after Sir Colville died, Lady Barclay married Sir Robert Vansittart, whose first wife had died in 1928.

== Offices held ==
Diplomatic posts
Preceded by Esme Howard	Envoy Extraordinary and Minister Plenipotentiary to His Majesty the King of Sweden; 1919–24	Succeeded by Sir Arthur Grant Duff
Preceded by Thomas Hohler	Envoy Extraordinary and Minister Plenipotentiary to the Kingdom of Hungary and Consul-General for the Kingdom of Hungary; 1924–28	Succeeded by Viscount Chilston
Preceded by Hon. Sir Lancelot Carnegie	Ambassador Extraordinary and Plenipotentiary to the Portuguese Republic; 1928–29	Succeeded by Hon. Sir Francis Lindley
