= Clan Barclay =

Lowland Scottish clan

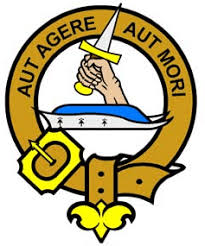
- Crest: On a chapeau Azure doubled Ermine, a hand holding a dagger Proper.
- Motto: Aut agere aut mori (Latin for 'Either action or death')

Profile
- Region: Lowlands
- District: Aberdeenshire
- Clan Barclay no longer has a chief, and is an armigerous clan
- Historic seat: Towie Barclay Castle, Aberdeenshire
- Last Chief: Peter Barclay of Towie Barclay and of that Ilk
- Died: 2 November 2023
Septs of Clan Barclay
Ardrossan, Barckley, Barckly, Barclaye, Barclet, Barclye, Barcula, Barkla, Barklaw, Barklay, Barkley, Barkly, Barraclough, Berkley, Berclay, Bercley, Berclie, Berekele, Berkeley, Tolley, Tollie, Towie, Towy, Tullie.
Clan branches
Barclay of Barclay (chiefs)
Barclay de Tolly (Russian nobility)

Clan Barclay Tartan
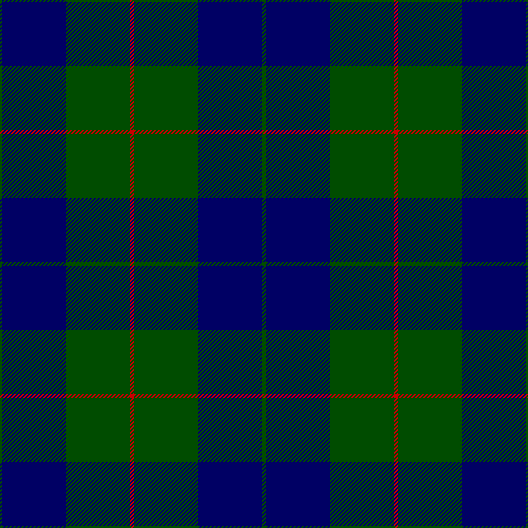
- The Clan Barclay tartan in Hunting colors.

Sett

Tartan registries
- STA: #705
- STWR: #705
- SRT entry: Clan Barclay

Clan Barclay Tartan
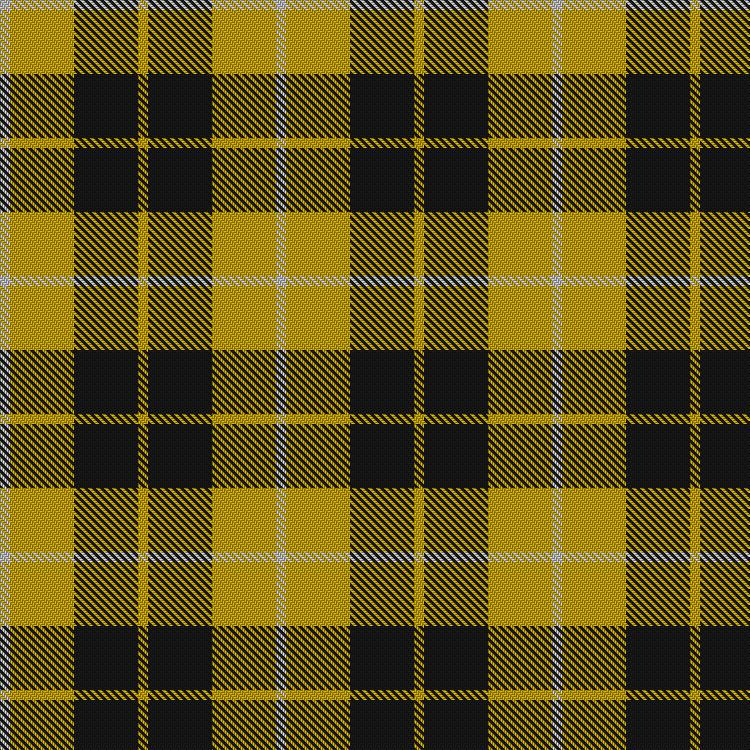
- The Clan Barclay tartan in Dress colors.

Sett

Tartan registries
- STA: #1879
- STWR: #1879
- SRT entry: Clan Barclay

Clan Barclay is a Scottish clan of the Lowlands.

== History ==
=== Origins of the clan ===
Since the eighteenth century, Barclay historians, noted for their low level in medieval scholarship, have assumed the Scottish family Barclay (de Berchelai) is a branch of one of the Anglo-Norman Berkeley family of Berkeley, Gloucestershire. However, the link between the Scottish and English families is disputed. The Collins Scottish Clan Encyclopedia agrees that the Barclays came over from France during the Norman conquest and that they settled in Gloucestershire, England where, as the Earls of Berkeley, they built Berkeley Castle in 1153. Some of the family moved north to Scotland where they settled in Aberdeenshire and Fife.

An old family tradition is that the Scottish family is descended from John de Berkeley, who was the son of Roger de Berkeley, provost of Berkeley, and went to Scotland in 1069 with St Margaret. Another theory is that the clan is descended from a John de Berkeley who went north in 1124 with Maud, queen of David I.

Another theory of the Barclay origin, put forth by the historian G. W. S. Barrow, points to the small village of Berkley in Somerset (in 1086 Berchelei). In 1086 the overlordship of Berkley belonged to Robert Arundel, whose main tenant was a Robert. Arundel's manors included Cary Fitzpaine (in Charlton Mackerell), near Castle Cary. Cary Fitzpaine seems to have been held by the tenant Robert as well. At the same time as Henry Lovel of Castle Cary first appears in Scotland, there appear the names of Godfrey de Arundel and Robert and Walter de Berkeley.

The most recent work on the family rejects previous ideas and instead proposes that there were two migrations of Barclays. The first of these involved a younger son of the original English family moving to Scotland in the first half of the twelfth century, while a second migration occurred around 1220. Only a distant kinship existed between these separate branches of the Scottish Barclays in the early thirteenth century, and the original family, including such notables as Walter de Berkeley, Chamberlain of Scotland, had become extinct in the male line around 1200. Charters from the reign of William the Lion show that the king granted the estates of Laurencekirk and Fordoun to Humphrey son of Theobald, in right of his wife Agatha. Agatha was herself a "de Berkeley" and her husband and children adopted her surname, but only her daughter survived into adulthood. A charter preserves Humphrey's father's surname as "de Adevil(l)e". This was about two decades before Roger de Berkeley, younger brother of Henry de Berkeley, lord of Dursley, married a Scottish heiress and became the ancestor of the succeeding Barclay families.

Both branches of Scottish Barclays soon established themselves in strong positions in land, offices and alliances. By 1171 Sir Walter de Berkeley was Chamberlain of Scotland. Sir David Barclay was a close associate of king Robert the Bruce, took part in the Wars of Scottish Independence and was present at most of his battles, most notably the Battle of Methven where he was captured. In more modern times, the descendants of the Barclay of Mathers line were noted for producing field marshals, Quakers and bankers.

=== 17th century ===
In the seventeenth century one branch of the Clan Barclay established themselves at Urie, near Stonehaven in Kincardineshire. Colonel David Barclay, the first Laird of Urie, was a soldier of fortune who fought for Gustavus Adolphus of Sweden. David Barclay attained the rank of major and returned to Scotland when the civil war broke out. During the civil war in Scotland he commanded a regiment of horse fighting for the king. He retired in 1647 but after the Restoration (1660) he was imprisoned in Edinburgh Castle on a charge of hostility to the government but was later released. While in prison he was converted into a Quaker by the Laird of Swinton who was also a prisoner. His son, Robert Barclay, was also a Quaker and published An Apology for the true Christian Divinity as the same is held forth and preached by the people called in scorn Quakers in 1675. Robert Barclay's second son, David Barclay, founded Barclays Bank.

Another branch of the Clan Barclay, the Barons of Towie, were involved in shipping trade in the 17th century between Scotland and Scandinavia, and the lands around the Baltic. In 1621 Sir Patrick Barclay, the seventeenth Baron of Towie, signed a letter of safe conduct for John and Peter Barclay, both merchants in the town of Banff, Aberdeenshire because they wished to settle in Rostock in Mecklenburg.

== Barclay de Tolly (Russian nobility) ==
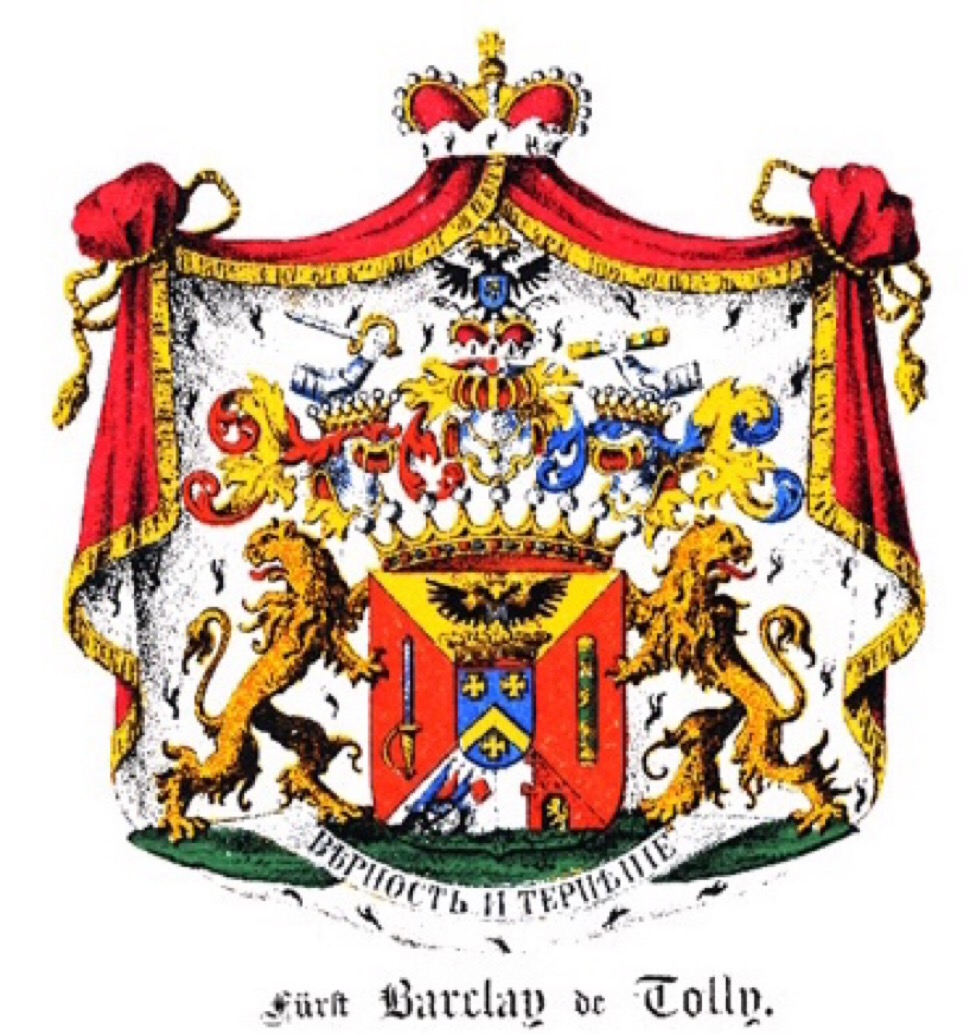
Princely arms of Barclay de Tolly

Five generations after Peter Barclay, his descendant the Russian Field Marshal Prince Michael Andreas Barclay de Tolly was born, in 1761. He was made Minister of War of the Russian Empire in 1810 and, two years later, was given command of the Russian armies that were fighting against Napoleon's invasion in 1812 and in the War of the Sixth Coalition.

The appointment of a Scottish commander-in-chief was resented by the nobles of Russia, but his capabilities were respected. He was created a prince by the Tsar and his memory is still honored in Russia, where his portrait hangs in the Hermitage Museum in Saint Petersburg. He died in 1818.

== Castles ==
- Towie Barclay Castle was formerly owned by the Barclays.
- Balvaird Castle was formerly owned by the Barclays.

== Chief ==
The clan is currently without a chief. The last chief was Peter Charles Barclay of Towie Barclay and of that Ilk, who died on 2 November 2023.
