= Steve Grand discography =

Musical output of American singer

- Studio albums: 2
- Singles: 6
- Music videos: 7
- Promotional singles: 2

American singer Steve Grand has released two studio albums, four singles and two promotional singles. His debut album All American Boy was released on March 23, 2015. Grand released his second album Not the End of Me independently on his own label on July 6, 2018. The album debut in the top 10 of the Billboard independent chart at the number 10 position on July 21, 2018.

== Studio albums ==
List of studio albums, with selected chart positions and sales figures
Title	Album details	Peak chart positions	Sales
Title	Album details	US	Sales
All American Boy	Released: March 24, 2015; Label: Grand Nation; Formats: CD, LP, digital download, streaming	47	US: 10,000 (Note: US sales for All American Boy as of March 2015)
Not the End of Me	Released: July 5, 2018; Label: Grand Nation; Formats: CD, LP, digital download, streaming	—	
"—" denotes a recording that did not chart or was not released in that territory.

== Singles ==
=== As lead artist ===
Title	Year	Album
"All-American Boy"	2013	All American Boy
"Stay"	2013	All American Boy
"Back to California"	2014	All American Boy
"Time"	2014	All American Boy
"We Are the Night (Dave Audé Remix)"	2016	Non-album single
"Look Away" (with Eli Lieb)	2016	Non-album single
"Walking"	2017	Not the End of Me

=== Promotional singles ===
Title	Year	Album
"Whiskey Crime"	2014	All American Boy
"Bennie and the Jets"	2014	Non-album single
"All I Want for Christmas is You"	2016	Non-album single

== Music videos ==
List of music videos, showing year released and directors
Title	Year	Director(s)
"All-American Boy"	2013	Jason Knade
"Stay"	2013	Jason Knade
"Back to California"	2014	Jason Knade
"Time"	2015	Brendan Leahy
"All I Want for Christmas Is You"	2015	John Lavin
"We Are the Night" (Dave Audé remix)	2016	John Lavin
"Look Away"	2016	—
"Walking"	2017	John Lavin
"Don't Let the Light In"	2018	—
"Disciple"	2019	Steve Grand; Arno Diem
"Pink Champagne"	2019	Jason Stead
"I'll Be Home for Christmas"	2010	John Lavin
