= All American Boy =

All American Boy may refer to:

== Music ==
- All American Boy (Rick Derringer album), 1973
- All American Boy (Steve Grand album), 2015
  - "All-American Boy", a 2013 song by Steve Grand
- "The All American Boy", a 1958 song by Bobby Bare

== Other uses ==
- The All-American Boy (film), a 1973 film by Charles Eastman
- All American Boy (novel), a 2005 novel by William J. Mann
- Jack Armstrong, the All-American Boy, a 1933-51 radio serial
