= Pink Champagne (disambiguation) =

Pink Champagne was a 1980s Swedish punk band.

Pink Champagne may also refer to:

- Pink Champagne (wine), Rosé Champagne wine
- "Pink Champagne" (E-girls song), 2016
- "Pink Champagne" (Joe Liggins song), 1950
- Pink Champagne, a 2018 EP or its title song by Kitten
- "Pink Champagne", an unreleased song by Ariana Grande, 2013
- "Pink Champagne", a song by Shakin' Stevens from There Are Two Kinds Of Music...Rock 'N' Roll, 1990
- "Pink Champagne", a song by The Avalanches from We Will Always Love You, 2020
- "Pink Champagne", a song by Carrie Underwood from Denim & Rhinestones, 2022
- "Pink Champagne", a 2018 song by Steve Grand
- Pink Champagne, a Bournemouth, UK-based team in breast cancer survivors' dragon boating
