= BRCC =

BRCC may refer to:

- Baton Rouge Community College, Louisiana, US
- Berkeley Racing Canoe Center, Berkeley, CA, US
- Black Rifle Coffee Company, based in Salt Lake City, Utah, US
- Blue Ridge Community College (North Carolina), US
- Blue Ridge Community College (Virginia), US
