= Berkeley Racing Canoe Center =

Dragon boat racing organization in California, U.S.

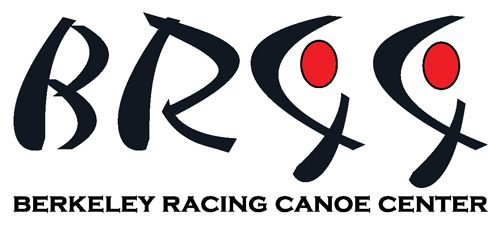
- Founded: November 3, 2006; 19 years ago Berkeley, California, US
- Type: 501(c)(3), charitable organization
- Location: Berkeley, California, US
- Coordinates: 37.864233°N 122.315689°W
- Region served: San Francisco Bay Area
- Members: 393 in 2024
- Website: https://thebrcc.org

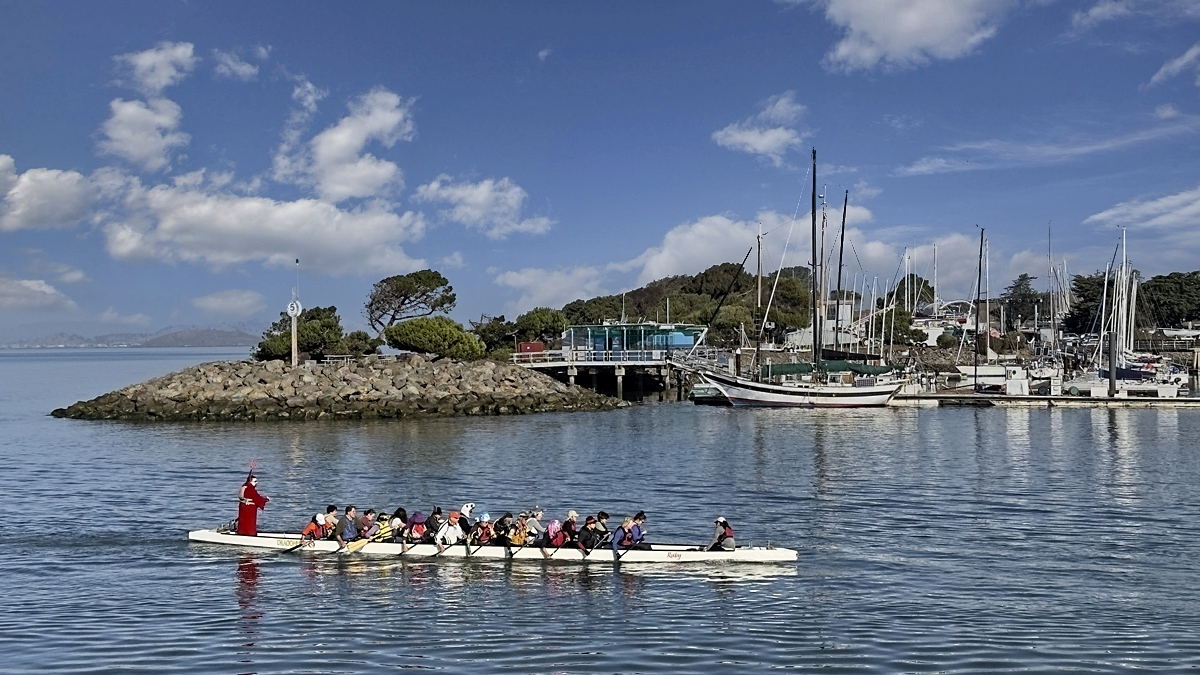
BRCC Spooktacular 2022

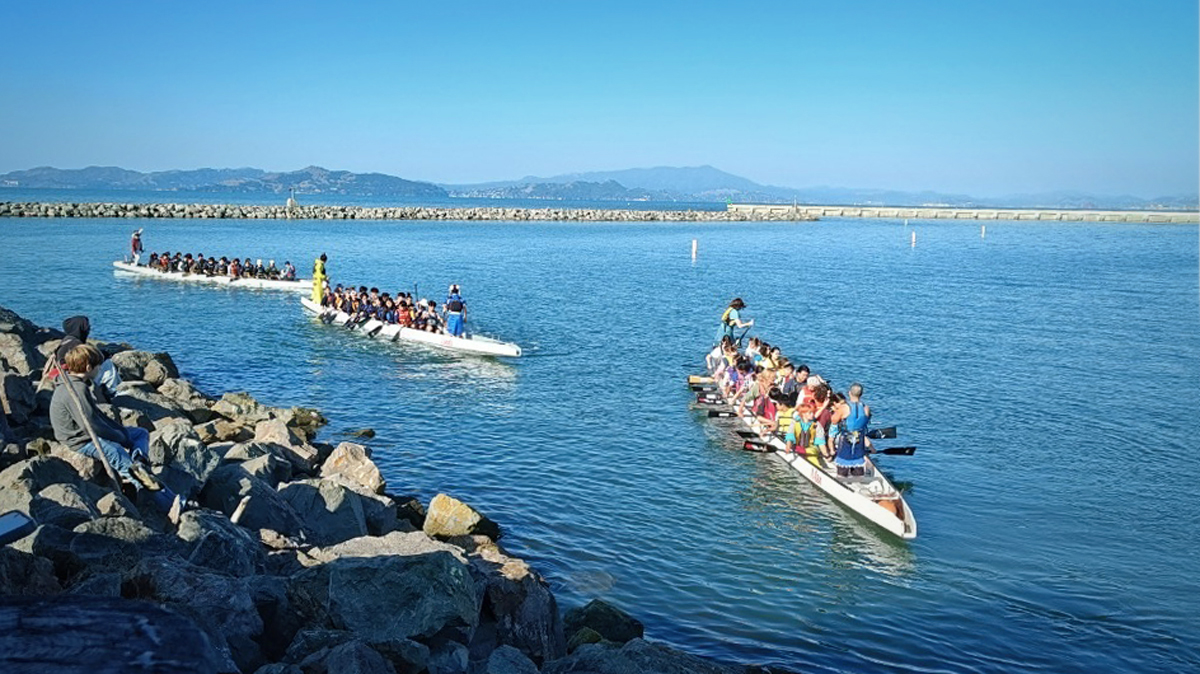
BRCC Spooktacular 2023

Berkeley Racing Canoe Center (BRCC) is the umbrella organization for several dragon boat teams in Berkeley, California. BRCC is located in the Berkeley Marina at Dock M, and teams primarily practice within the protection of the 65-acre yacht harbor. Three main teams are currently affiliated with BRCC: DragonMax, Cal Dragon, and East Bay Rough Riders. BRCC teams compete at local, national, and international dragon boat races, including the International Dragon Boat Federation Club Crew World Championships in Ravenna, Italy (2014 and 2024), Adelaide, Australia (2016), and Szeged, Hungary (2018). BRCC teams also conduct many short-duration dragon boat events for local community groups. BRCC is a registered 501(c)(3) non-profit organization.

== Equipment ==
BRCC has four 20-person dragon boats and one 10-person boat. Each boat is equipped with a detachable dragon head, tail, drum, and drummer's seat, but these items are typically used for special events rather than during daily practice. BRCC also has many dragon boat paddles and personal flotation devices (PFDs) for use by members, guests, and community events participants. In addition to dragon boats, BRCC has a fleet of smaller watercraft, including one- and two-person outrigger canoes (outrigger boat), one- and two-person kayaks, and a standup paddle board (SUP).

== Community events ==
BRCC regularly invites community groups to participate in dragon boating during short-duration paddling events. BRCC provides adult, youth, and child-size paddles and appropriately-sized personal flotation devices (PFDs) to all participants and a brief instruction in paddling technique. Each community event, typically lasting an hour, allows novice paddlers the opportunity to try team canoeing. BRCC also participates annually in two large community events: the Berkeley Bay Festival and Fourth of July celebration, and recently added a Lunar New Year event with dragon boat rides, lion dancing, crafts, and holiday-themed food. During these all-day events that use BRCC's entire fleet of dragon boats, up to 1000 community members are able to paddle for about 20 minutes in a short loop through the Berkeley Marina. BRCC members have also participated in off-water community service events, including the California Coastal Cleanup Day.

== Affiliated teams ==
=== DragonMax ===
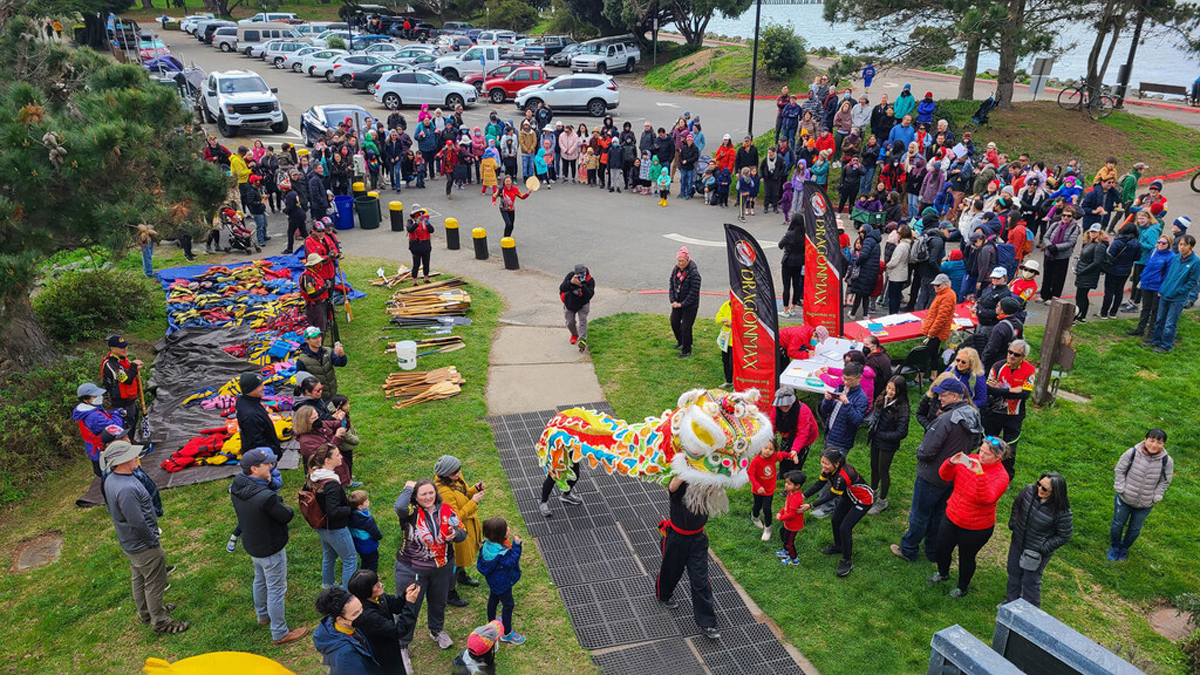
Lunar New Year of the Rabbit Festival 2023, Lion Dance

DragonMax, founded in 2003, is an adult team with 215 members who range in age from 18 to 84. Team members are primarily Bay Area residents, but may come from as far away as Sacramento and Morro Bay, California. The team practices year-round on Saturday mornings and from one to four weekday evenings. DragonMax teams race competitively in local, national, and international events sponsored by the California Dragon Boat Association, the United States Dragon Boat Federation, and the International Dragon Boat Federation. Depending on the event, DragonMax team members may race in men's, women's, or mixed boats in open (any age), senior A (over 40), B (over 50), and C (over 60) divisions in distances ranging from 200 to 2000 meters.

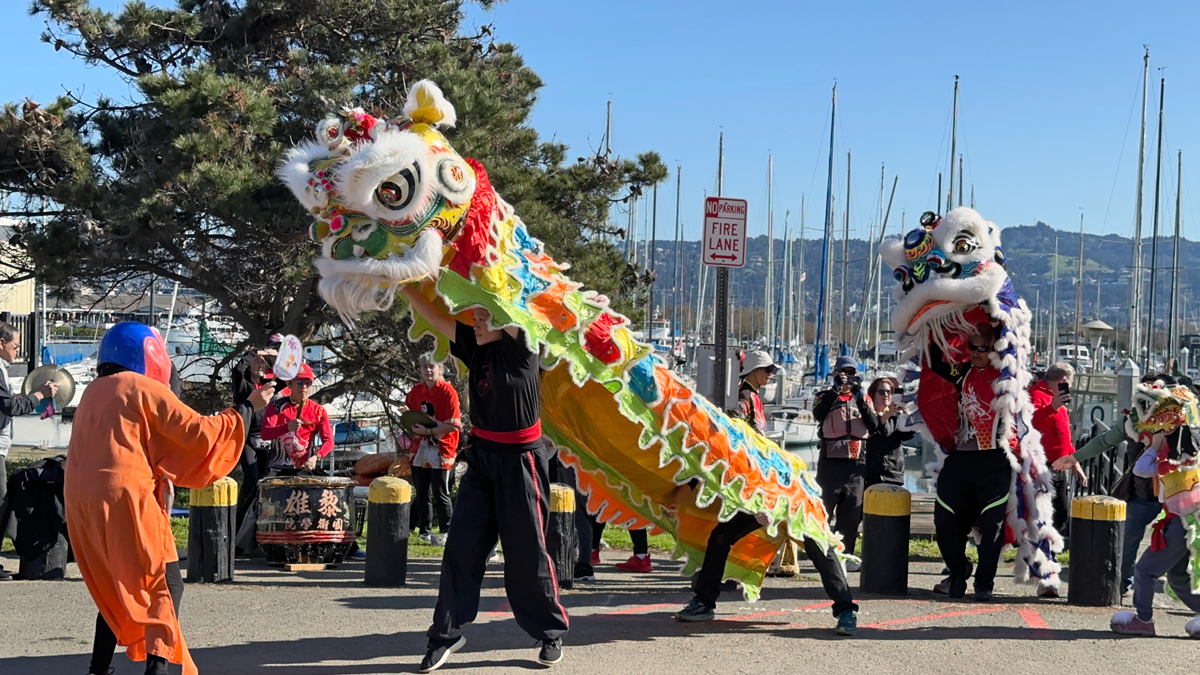
Lunar New Year of the Dragon Festival 2024, Lion Dance

=== Cal Dragon Boat ===
Cal Dragons (or Cal Dragon Boat) is a competitive student-run dragon boat team founded in 1998 at the University of California, Berkeley. Cal Dragons regularly compete in local, national, and international dragon boat events. They recruit prospective paddlers twice each year, typically only accepting 10% of the many students who try out for the team. In addition to competing on Cal Dragons, several members also compete on the USDBF Under-24 (U24) national team.

=== East Bay Rough Riders ===
East Bay Rough Riders is a high school team with members from El Cerrito High School, Berkeley High School and other students from around the East Bay. Rough Riders compete in local and international dragon boat races.

=== Other teams ===
In addition to Dragon Max, Cal Dragons, and Rough Riders, BRCC members work with several corporate dragon boat teams on a short-term basis to prepare for one-day specialty races. Several BRCC members also compete on breast cancer and/or all-cancer survivor teams.
