= United States Dragon Boat Federation =

US governing body for dragon boat racing

The United States Dragon Boat Federation (USDBF) is the official national governing body for the sport of dragon boat racing in the United States and has been a Full Member of the International Dragon Boat Federation (IDBF) since 1991. The United States was a Charter Member of the founding of the IDBF in 1990, via the American Dragon Boat Association of Iowa. The USDBF is also a member of the Pan American Dragon Boat Federation (PADBF). It is a volunteer organization.

The USDBF sends a national team to the IDBF World Nations Championships and representative teams to the IDBF Club Crew World Championships. It also organizes US national championships.

== Mission ==
The mission of the USDBF is “To promote the growth and development of dragon boating in the U.S. for fitness, recreation, and team building at all levels of competition.”

== Regions & governance ==
The USDBF is divided into four regions: Pacific, Midwest, Southeastern, and Eastern regions. Each region is governed by its own regional body; these governing bodies are the Pacific Dragon Boat Association of the West Coast (PDBA), the American Dragon Boat Association of the Mid-West (ADBA), the Southeastern Regional Dragon Boat Association (SRDBA), and the Eastern Regional Dragon Boat Association (ERDBA).

== Club Crew National Championships (CCNC) ==
The USDBF holds Club Crew National Championships in September of every other year. A team must have accrued enough points at USDBF-sanctioned races throughout the year to qualify to compete at the CCNC. The champions of the five divisions win berths to represent the US at the following year's IDBF Club Crew World Championships.

USDBF Club Crew National Championships have been held in the following locations:

Year	City	State
1998	Flushing	New York
2000	Philadelphia	Pennsylvania
2002	Lake Merritt	California
2004	Fort Dodge	Iowa
2006	Tampa	Florida
2008	Long Beach	California
2010	Chattanooga	Tennessee
2011	Fort Dodge	Iowa
2013	Mercer Lake	New Jersey
2015	Lake Arlington	Illinois
2017	Mercer Lake	New Jersey
2019	Colorado Springs	Colorado
2021	Sarasota	Florida
2023	Sarasota	Florida
2025	Sarasota	Florida

== National team (Team USA) ==
As a member of the International Dragon Boat Federation, the USDBF sends a national team ("Team USA") to the IDBF World Nations Championships, held in odd-numbered years. Team USA is organized by the High Performance Committee of the USDBF. Members are individually picked, similar to the Olympic Team USA. The United States competes in all divisions: Junior A (aka U18), Junior B (U16), U24, Premier, Senior A, Senior B (Grand Dragons), and Senior C (Great Grand Dragons). However, the US typically only competes in standard 20-person boats, and as of 2018, has only raced small 10-person boats on the international level in 2011.

The USDBF is also allowed five berths (in each division) to send representative club crews to the IDBF Club Crew World Championships, held in even-numbered years (see CCNC section above).

=== Selection process ===
The specifics of different coaches' selection processes differ. However, all coaches use a combination of dry land testing and on-water testing. Attitude, experience, and body weight are also considered.

- Dry-land testing typically consists of an ergometer (Concept 2 indoor rowing machine with paddle adapter) test, weight-lifting, and bodyweight exercises (push-ups, pull-ups, etc.).
- On-water testing typically consists of a time trial in an outrigger canoe. Some coaches use an OC-1, while others use an OC-2.

=== Coaches ===
Team USA has had many coaches over the years. Some of them include: Robert "Bob" McNamara, Colleen McNamara, Pete McNamara, Randy Ng, Chris Marquart, Jaimie Richmond, Ellen Law, Pat Bradley, Jeff Kuhn, Joshua Hwung, Chitthavong "Kitt" Noythanongsay, and Nathan Salazar.

Robert "Bob" McNamara is the most successful dragon boat coach in the United States. The teams he has coached/co-coached have won over 100 IDBF World Nations Championships medals, including 23 gold medals. He has been coaching since 1986.

== Hosted IDBF World Nations Championships (WDBRC) ==
The United States hosted the 4th IDBF World Nations Championships in Philadelphia, Pennsylvania, in 2001, and the 10th IDBF World Nations Championships in Tampa Bay, Florida, in 2011.

== United States at IDBF World Nations Championships (WDBRC) ==
The United States has won many medals at the international level; medals standings from the IDBF World Nations Championships (also called the World Dragon Boat Racing Championships, or WDBRC) are listed below.

=== 13th WDBRC 2017 (Kunming, China) ===
Team USA came in 3rd overall in standard boat racing, with Canada taking 1st and China taking 2nd.

The Junior/U24 division races were held in Divonne-les-Bains, France, in conjunction with the European Club Crew Championships. Team USA did not attend.

Boat Type	Age Division	Number of Gold	Number of Silver	Number of Bronze
Standard	Senior C	0	4	5
Standard	Senior B	1	3	6
Standard	Senior A	0	1	10
Standard	Premier	3	2	4
Total		4	10	25

=== 12th WDBRC 2015 (Welland, Canada) ===
Team USA came in 3rd overall in standard boat racing, with Canada taking 1st and China taking 2nd.

Boat Type	Age Division	Number of Gold	Number of Silver	Number of Bronze
Standard	Junior B	0	1	0
Standard	Junior A	0	0	2
Standard	U24	0	11	0
Standard	Senior C	0	1	5
Standard	Senior B	0	3	8
Standard	Senior A	0	6	3
Standard	Premier	2	7	0
Total		2	29	18

=== 11th WDBRC 2013 (Szeged, Hungary) ===
Team USA came in 6th overall, behind Canada, China, Australia, Germany, and Ukraine.

Boat Type	Age Division	Number of Gold	Number of Silver	Number of Bronze
Standard	U24	0	0	1
Standard	Senior C	0	0	7
Standard	Senior B	0	6	2
Standard	Senior A	1	4	4
Standard	Premier	1	2	3
Total		2	12	17

=== 10th WDBRC 2011 (Tampa, USA) ===
Team USA came in 1st overall in small boat racing.

Boat Type	Age Division	Number of Gold	Number of Silver	Number of Bronze
Small	Junior B	4	0	0
Small	Junior A	2	1	1
Small	U23	1	1	0
Total		7	2	1

Team USA came in 4th overall in standard boat racing, behind Canada, Germany, and Russia.

Boat Type	Age Division	Number of Gold	Number of Silver	Number of Bronze
Standard	Junior A	0	0	3
Standard	U23	0	6	2
Standard	Senior B	0	6	3
Standard	Senior A	0	4	3
Standard	Premier	3	5	1
Total		3	21	12

=== 9th WDBRC 2009 (Račice, Czech Republic) ===
Team USA came in 5th overall, behind Canada, Slovakia, China, and Singapore.

Boat Type	Age Division	Number of Gold	Number of Silver	Number of Bronze
Standard	Junior B	2	1	0
Standard	Senior B	0	3	2
Standard	Senior A	0	1	4
Standard	Premier	1	3	2
Total		3	8	8

== Hosted IDBF Club Crew World Championships (CCWC) ==
The United States hosted the 13th IDBF Club Crew World Championships in Sarasota, Florida, in 2022.

== United States at IDBF Club Crew World Championships (CCWC) ==
Many different crews have represented the United States at the IDBF CCWCs over the years. Listed below are some of those teams, along with the divisions in which they raced.

=== 11th CCWC 2018 (Szeged, Hungary) ===
Team Name	Hometown	Divisions
Dragon Boat Charleston	Charleston, SC	ACS
Central Coast SurviveOars Morro Bay	Morro Bay, CA	ACS, BCP
Hope Afloat USA Philadelphia	Philadelphia, PA	BCP
Oyster Point U16 South San Francisco	San Francisco, USA	Junior A, Junior B
Lincoln High School San Francisco	San Francisco, USA	Junior A
Southern Heat The Villages	The Villages, FL	Senior B, Senior C
WAM (Seattle SAKE)	Seattle, WA	Senior A, Senior C
Dragonheart Vermont Burlington, Vermont, USA	Burlington, VT	BCP, Premier
Windy City Dragons Chicago	Chicago, IL	Senior A
Philadelphia Flying Phoenix	Philadelphia, PA	Senior A
DragonMax	Berkeley, CA	Senior A, Senior B, Senior C
Wasabi Paddling Club Portland	Portland, OR	Premier, Senior A
Team DPW Los Angeles	Los Angeles, CA	Junior A, Premier
Boston 1 Dragon Boat Team	Boston, MA	Premier
Schuylkill Dragons Philadelphia	Philadelphia, PA	Premier, Senior B
Aero Dragons Los Angeles	Los Angeles, CA	Senior A
Bucks County Dragon Boat New Hope	New Hope, PA	Senior A
Long Beach Masters Long Beach, California	Long Beach, CA	Senior A
Northwind San Francisco	San Francisco, CA	Premier
Los Angeles Racing Dragons Long Beach	Los Angeles, CA	Premier

=== 10th CCWC 2016 (Adelaide, Australia) ===
Team Name	Hometown	Divisions
Space Dragons	Long Beach, CA	Premier
Ripple Effect Dragon Boat Team	San Francisco, CA	Premier
Long Beach Masters	Long Beach, CA	Senior A
Bay Area Dragons	Foster City, CA	Senior B
Miami Dragon Slayers	Miami, FL	Premier
Team DPW	Irwindale, CA	Premier
DragonMax	Berkeley, CA	Senior C
WAM		Senior B
Paddles and Pearls Charleston	Charleston, SC	BCS
Vancouver Lake Aquatic Center Catch-22		Senior A
Golden Dragons		Senior C

=== 9th CCWC 2014 (Ravenna, Italy) ===
Team Name	Hometown	Divisions
Dragonheart Vermont Burlington, VT	Burlington, VT	BCS, Senior B, Senior C
Pink Paddler Power BCS Racine	Racine, WI	BCS
Windy City Dragons Chicago, IL	Chicago, IL	Premier, Senior A
Florida Tarpons Miami, FL	Miami, FL	Premier, Senior A
Wasabi Paddling Club Beaverton, OR	Portland, OR	Premier, Senior A, Senior C
Philadelphia Flying Phoenix	Philadelphia, PA	Premier, Senior A
California United Los Angeles		Premier
Catch22 NYC New York	New York, NY	Premier
San Diego Dragon Boat Team La Mesa		Senior A, Senior B
Jax Fire Dragons Jacksonville, FL	Jacksonville, FL	Senior A
Long Beach Masters	Long Beach, CA	Senior A
DragonMax Berkeley, California	Berkeley, CA	Senior A, Senior B, Senior C
Schuylkill Dragons Philadelphia	Philadelphia, PA	Senior B
Grand Masters DBC USA The Villages. FL	The Villages, FL	Senior B, Senior C
Portland Fire Dragons Portland, Oregon	Portland, OR	Premier
Dragon Boat Club of Boston	Boston, MA	Premier

== See also ==
- Dragon boat
- International Dragon Boat Federation
- Breast cancer survivors' dragon boating
- United States of America
- American sports
