= Nathan Benderson Park =

Park and rowing venue in Florida

- North Metro Park, Cooper Creek Park
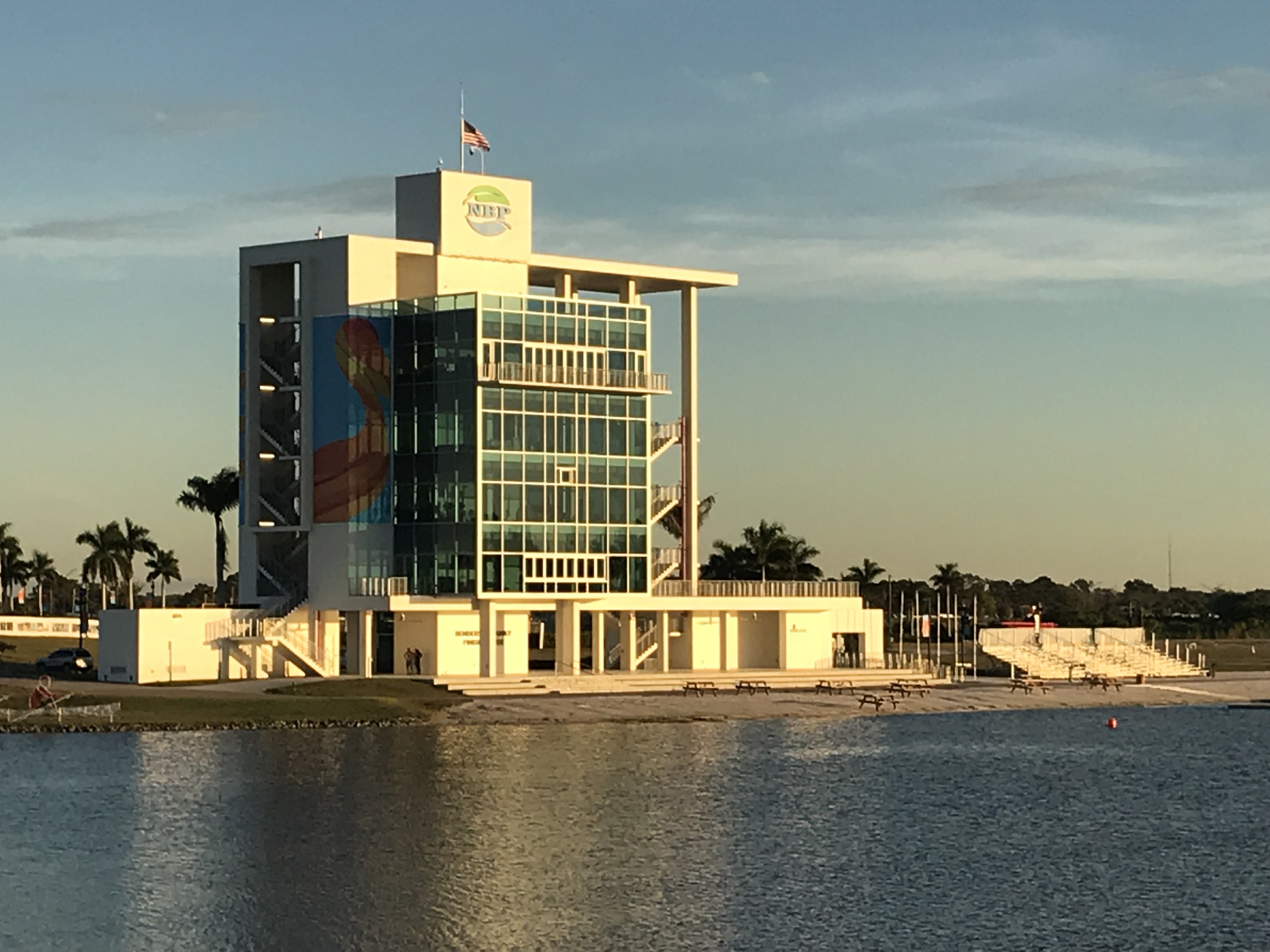
- Nathan Benderson Park Finish Tower
- Interactive map of Nathan Benderson Park
- Location: Sarasota County, Florida
- Coordinates: 27.374°N 82.451°W
- Area: 600 acres (2.4 km^{2})
- Established: 1995 (North Metro Park); 2014 (Nathan Benderson Park)
- Manager: Nathan Benderson Park Conservancy
- Open: Year round
- Public transit: Breeze Transit
- Website: nathanbendersonpark.org

Nathan Benderson Park, previously known as North Metro Park and Cooper Creek Park, is a 600-acre (240 ha) park in the U.S. state of Florida, owned by Sarasota County. It incorporates a 400-acre (160 ha) artificial lake in northern Sarasota County, directly south of the Manatee County county line, west of Interstate 75. The lake is a rowing venue and hosted the 2017 World Rowing Championships.

== History ==
The area was originally used as pasture land. The land was excavated for Interstate 75, which runs to the east of the lake. The section of Interstate 75 between U.S. 301 north of the lake, to River Road near North Port further south opened in 1981. Cooper Creek flows through the lake and drains in Braden River further north. In 1995, the land changed ownership from APAC-Florida Incorporated to Sarasota County for US$2.2 million. Sarasota County named the area North Metro Park. At the time, access was by dirt road only from The Meadows, a community immediately to the west, and recreational use apart from motor boats was permitted.

In 2003, the Benderson Development Company, a developer of shopping centers based in Buffalo, moved to an area immediately north of the park. A year later, the park's name was changed to Cooper Creek Park. From 2005 onwards, Benderson Development Co. leased the northernmost 101 acres of the park. The company then donated US$1 million to Sarasota County and was given naming rights in return, and the name changed to Nathan Benderson Park on November 20, 2007, after the company's founder. Benderson Development Co. was then given approval to develop 276 acres (112 ha) adjacent to the park, and in return was required to develop a master plan for the park, management plan, and construction plan for further development. The concept plan was approved in 2010, and the development plan the following year.

Also, in 2010, a non-profit organization was set up to manage the park – Suncoast Aquatic Nature Center Associates Inc. (SANCA). North Cattlemen Road was realigned in 2012 so that a regatta course meeting the requirements of the International Rowing Federation (FISA) could be established. In 2013, the lake was lengthened and deepened, and an island was created as an event center, with a return channel around the island that clears the 2,000-meter course to ensure more rapid regatta race starts. Nathan Benderson Park officially opened to the public in 2014. North Cattlemen Road provides the main access to the venue. SANCA would go on to change its name in 2022 to more closely align with the park. The nonprofit is now called Nathan Benderson Park Conservancy.

== Event history ==
During 2009, the first four rowing regattas were held on the lake. In 2013, president Barack Obama, put his support behind Sarasota County's bid to host the 2017 World Rowing Championships. The other applicant for the regatta was Plovdiv in Bulgaria, which had hosted the 2012 World Rowing Championships. Officials from FISA visited Nathan Benderson Park in April 2013. Later in 2013, the championships were awarded to Sarasota. Since the 2017 World Rowing Championships, the park was host for the 2018 World Rowing Masters Regatta and the 2019 World Rowing U23 Championships.

In 2014, the lake was used by the International Breast Cancer Paddlers' Commission for a dragon boating convention. In 2015, the first stage of the Modern Pentathlon World Cup was held on the lake, and in the following year, the final race was held at Nathan Benderson Park. The USRowing Youth National Championships were held on the lake in 2015, 2017 and 2019, and are in a seven-year run from 2019 to 2026 (2020 scratched because of the coronavirus pandemic). The lake was also the site of the 2016 and 2020 U.S. Olympic Team Trials- Rowing and the 2020 U.S. Olympic Team Trials-Canoe/Kayak, and will be the site of the 2021 U.S. Dragon Boat Federation Club Crew National Championships in 2022 International Dragon Boat Federation Club Crew World Championships.

== Everyday use ==
The park's 3.4 miles (5.5 km) of parallel paved and shell trails are popular with runners, walkers, joggers, bicyclists, rollerblades, and more. The park is known for its fishing, both on and off the water, and is ideal for recreational kayaking, canoeing, sailing, remote-controlled sailboats, and other non-gas-powered vessels. Many community events, fairs, and festivals use the park's 28-acre Regatta Island, as well as the trails for running and walking events.
