= Breast cancer survivors' dragon boating =

Water sport for cancer survivors

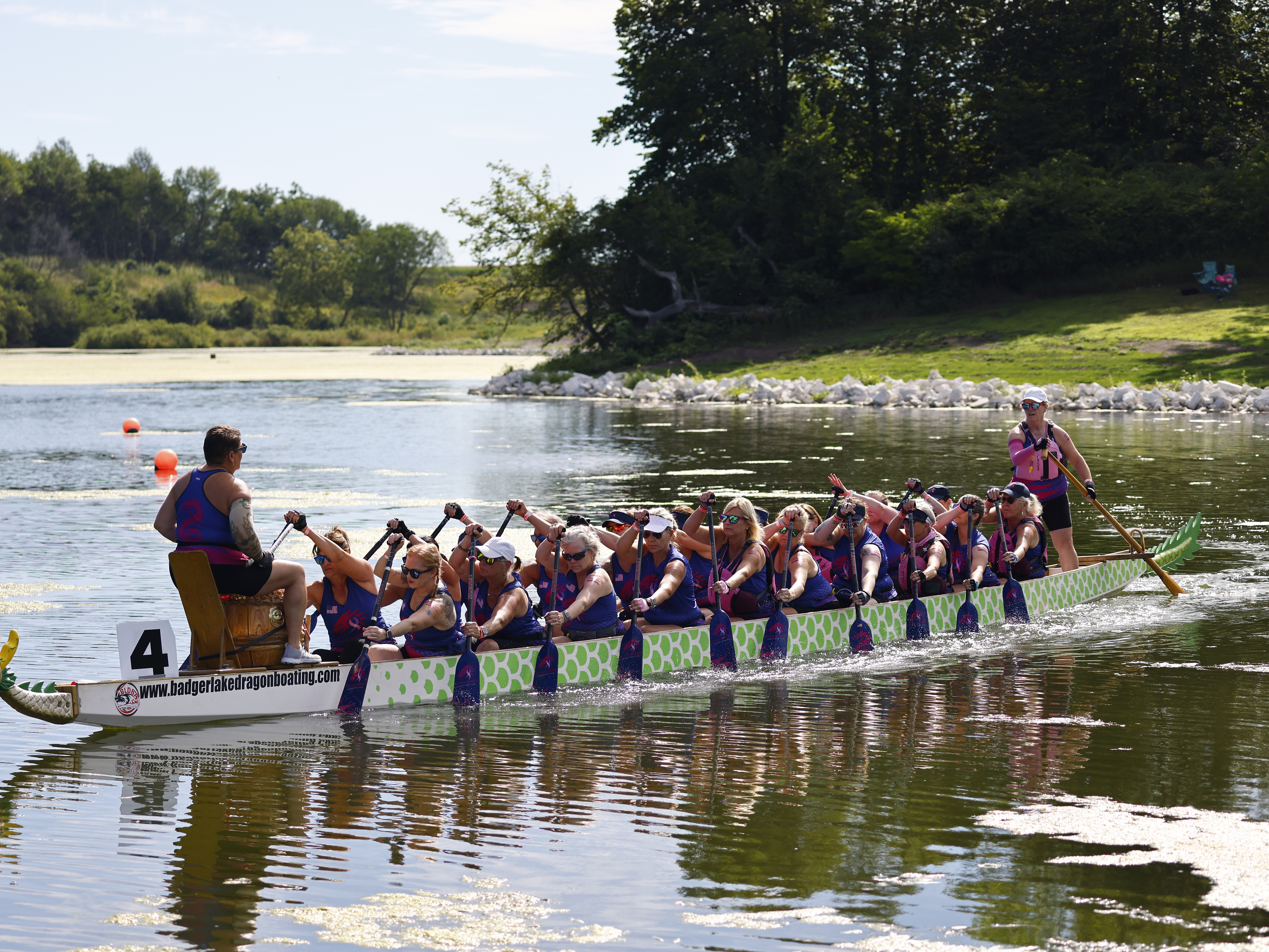
Cancer survivors preparing to compete in Iowa, USA

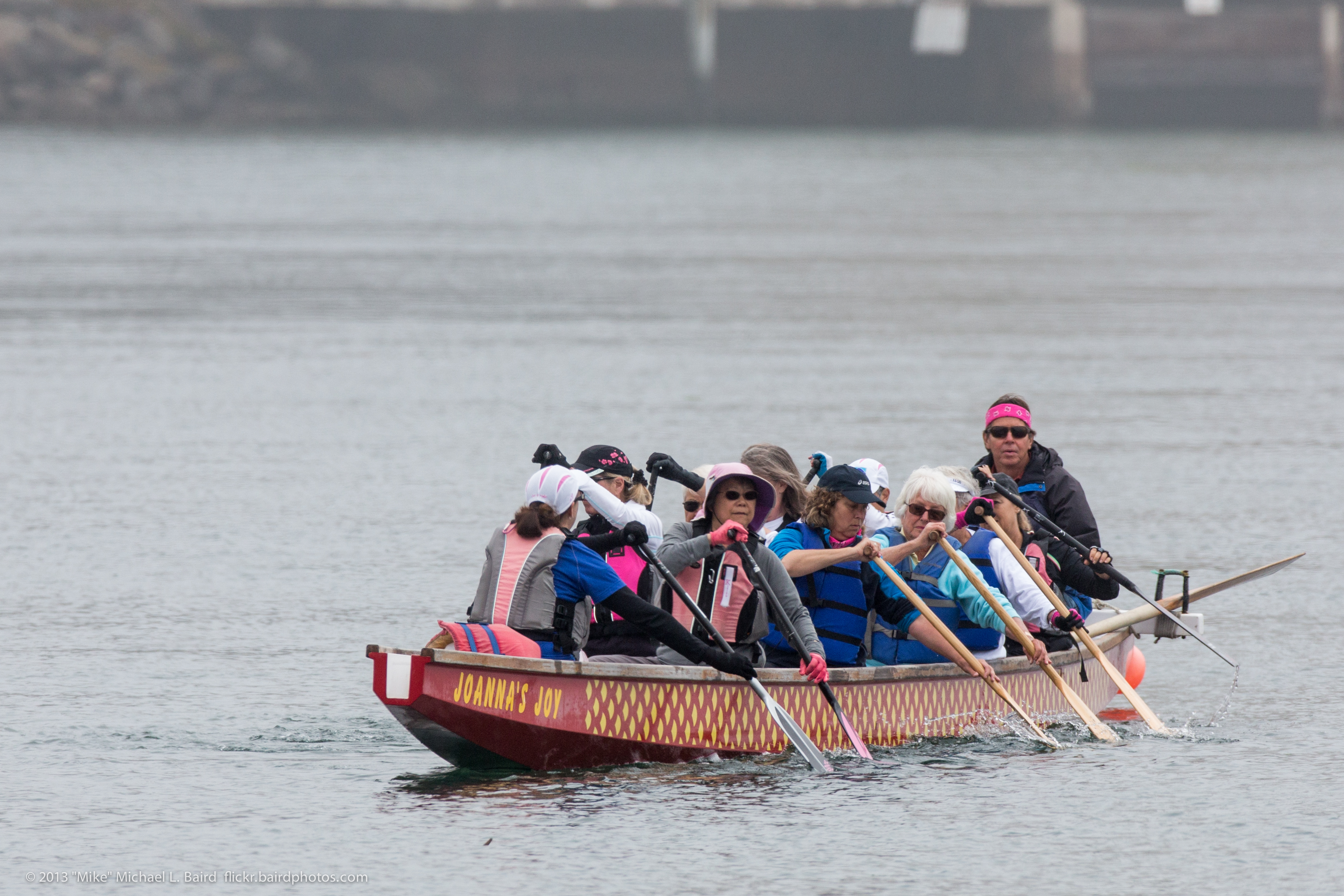
Breast cancer survivors' dragon boating in California

Breast cancer survivors' dragon boating is an international movement inspired by the research of Canadian sports medicine specialist Don McKenzie. Survivors of breast cancer come together to paddle dragon boats to the benefit of their physical health and social wellbeing. It is supported internationally by the International Breast Cancer Paddlers' Commission (IBCPC), an Associate Member of the International Dragon Boat Federation.

== Research ==
Donald Chisholm ("Don") McKenzie OC MSM is a Canadian sports medicine specialist at the University of British Columbia, professor in the School of Kinesiology and Director of the Allan McGavin Sports Medicine Centre. In a 1998 paper in the Canadian Medical Association Journal McKenzie described how in February 1996 he started a dragon boat team for women with a history of breast cancer, which the women chose to name Abreast in a Boat. He believed that this activity would benefit breast cancer survivors as it provided strenuous upper body activity in an aesthetically pleasing and socially supportive environment.

His paper concludes:

How important is the Abreast in a Boat project? It is an approach to promoting health and raising breast cancer awareness that is driven by women with the disease. It reaches out to other women and offers them a message of hope and support. It is helping to change attitudes toward "life after breast cancer," and it encourages women to lead full and active lives. It is making a difference.

In 2001, McKenzie was awarded the Meritorious Service Medal for his work with Abreast in a Boat. The citation ended with the words: "His remarkable achievements, enhanced by his guidance and caring, have given breast cancer survivors across Canada a sense of confidence and pride, and a lifeline to a better existence." In 2021, McKenzie received the Order of Canada for "his seminal research on the effectiveness of exercise as an intervention for breast cancer patients".

Later research published by Mitchell et al. concluded that: "The interview data support the emerging hypothesis that dragon boating is a vehicle for improving women's wellness and post-treatment quality of life."

== Around the world ==
The International Breast Cancer Paddlers' Commission (IBCPC) is an international organisation based in Canada. It describes itself as: "an international umbrella organisation whose mandate is to encourage the establishment of breast cancer dragon boat teams, within the framework of participation and inclusiveness. We support the development of recreational dragon boat paddling as a contribution to a healthy life style for those diagnosed with breast cancer." The IBCPC is an Associate Member of the International Dragon Boat Federation (IDBF), the world governing body for Dragon Boating, and the IBCPC President is a Member of the IDBF Council.

In August 2011, the ICBPC had a total of 116 member organisations in 9 countries: Australia (29 groups), Canada (41), Ireland (1), Italy (5), New Zealand (7), Singapore (1), South Africa (1), United Kingdom (7) and United States (24). By December 2020 it had 236 teams in 29 countries including 57 in the United States, 56 in Canada, and single clubs in Fiji and Qatar.

As of 2026 there are 403 teams across 42 countries, and 6 continents. this represents approximately 20,000 breast cancer survivor paddlers across the globe.

New Zealand has the highest number of breast cancer teams per capita in the world, and other countries with the biggest numbers of teams are in the US, Canada, and Australia.

=== Dragon boat festivals ===
The IBCPC sponsors dragon boat competitions about every four years:

- 2026 - Aix-les-Bains, France
- 2023 - New Zealand
- 2018 – Florence, Italy
- 2014 – Nathan Benderson Park, Sarasota, Florida, United States
- 2010 – Peterborough, Ontario, Canada
- 2007 – Caloundra, Australia
- 2005 – Vancouver, British Columbia, Canada

=== Australia ===
Dragon boat racing for breast cancer survivors was introduced to Australia by Michelle Hanton OAM originating in Darwin in 1998.

Dragons Abreast Australia head office is based in Brisbane in Queensland and is a registered charity. Dragons Abreast Australia Ltd (DAA) has grown into the peak body for breast cancer survivor paddling groups around Australia and is a member of the Australian Dragon Boat Federation and the International Breast Cancer Paddlers Commission. Members adopt a set of common guiding principles and adhere to the philosophy of participation and inclusiveness.

=== Canada ===
Canadian breast cancer dragon boat teams sprung up rapidly across the country beginning in 1997.

Some of the teams include (from oldest to newest):

The original Abreast in a Boat team continues in Vancouver, paddling twice weekly from March to July.

Dragons Abreast (Toronto) was founded in Toronto, Ontario in 1997 by Eleanor Nielsen. They are the 2nd BCS dragon boat team to be formed in the world.

Island Breaststrokers was founded in Victoria, British Columbia in 1997 by Marjorie Woodroffe.

Knot A Breast was founded in Hamilton, Ontario in 1998.

Sistership was founded in Calgary, Alberta in 1998.

Bosom Buddies of Nova Scotia was founded in Mahone Bay, Nova Scotia in 1998 by Sharon Driscoll and Margo Kleiker.

Busting with Energy was founded in Saskatoon, SK in 1998.

Chemo Savvy was founded in Winnipeg, MB in 1998.

Busting Out Ottawa was founded in Ottawa, Ontario in 1998 by Cynthia Ann (Kim) Ostrom.

Two Abreast / Côte-à-côte was founded in Montreal, QC in 1998.

Abreast A River was founded in New Glasgow, Nova Scotia in 1999.

Breast Friends was founded in Edmonton, Alberta in 1999.

BreastStrokes was founded in Guelph, Ontario in 1999 by Valerie Powell, Margaret Brewer, and Margaret Blatherwick.

Warriors of Hope was founded in North Bay, Ontario in 1999.

Survivor Thrivers was founded in Cobourg, Ontario in 1999 by Dorothy Hampson.

Survivors Abreast was founded in Peterborough, Ontario in 1999 by Meredith Cosburn.

Waves of Hope was founded in Brandon, MB in 1999.

Buoyant Buddies was founded in Vernon, British Columbia.

Cowichan Valley Dragon Divas was founded in Cowichan Valley, British Columbia.

Angels Abreast was founded in Nanaimo, British Columbia in 2000

NorthBreast Passage was founded in Courtenay, British Columbia in 2000 by Dr. Linda Wilson.

Rowbust was founded in London, Ontario in 2000 by Dr. Annette Richard.

Survivorship was founded in Penticton, British Columbia in 2000 by Cathie Lauer and Sue Butchart.

Abreast of Bridge was founded in Lethbridge, AB in 2001.

Breast Buddies was founded in Sarnia, ON in 2001.

Hope Afloat Canada was founded in Courtenay, British Columbia in 2002.

Breasts Ahoy was founded in Saint John, NB in 2003.

Chestmates was founded in Kingston, Ontario in 2003 by Suzanne Bodner with the long-time support of Breast Cancer Action Kingston (BCAK).

Les Phénix de La Rose was founded in Sherbrooke, QC in 2003.

River Spirit was founded in Campbell River, British Columbia in 2003.

The Dragon Flies was founded in Lindsay, Ontario in 2003.

Ribbons of Hope was founded in Barrie, Ontario in 2003 by Sue Macallum.

West Island Dragons was founded in Montreal, QC in 2003.

Wonder Broads was founded in Windsor, ON in 2003

Pink Sensations was founded in Pickering, Ontario in 2004.

Sunshine Dragons Abreast was founded in Sechelt, BC in 2005.

Team SOS was founded in Shortt's Lake NS in 2006.

Paddling For Life was founded in Powell River BC in 2006

Abreast with FORTitude was founded in Langley, BC in 2006, and is an Abreast in a Boat crew.

Hope Floats were founded in Welland, Ontario in 2007 and train in Welland as part of the South Niagara Canoe club founded by Carolyn Swan 2007.

Avalon Dragons was founded in Town of Paradise, NL in 2008.

Pink Crusaders was founded in Toronto, Ontario in 2015. They train in Toronto at the Outer Harbour Dragon Boat Club.

Bernie's Boat was founded in Saugeen Shores Ontario in 2024 by Geordie Farrell and has grown from 8 to over 60 members.

=== New Zealand ===
BCS teams as of June 2026

- Busting With Life, Auckland.
- Pink Dragons, Auckland.
- Waikato Treasure Chests, Hamilton).
- Boobops, Tauranga.
- Taranaki Dragons, New Plymouth (not yet a full team, but working on it).
- Can Survive, Wellington.
- Abreast of Life, Christchurch.
- Bay Bosom Buddies, Havelock North, Hawke's Bay Region;
- Southern Swell, Dunedin;

There is no national BCS entity in New Zealand, however there is a BCS division at the National Championships and NZDBA has a board member with responsibility for Breast Cancer and Special Interests.

=== Republic of Ireland ===
Donegal Dragons was founded in Donegal Town in 2013 and paddles on Donegal Bay in Donegal.

Dublin, Plurabelle Paddlers was the first dragon boat club in Ireland, founded in 2010 by Fiona Tiernan and Marian O’Dea.

=== Singapore ===
Paddlers in the Pink was started in January 2003 in Singapore, being Asia's first dragon boat team comprising only breast cancer survivors and supporters. PIP was the only team from Asia participated in the 2014 IBCPC in Florida, USA. PIP continues to support IBCPC and will be participating in the upcoming 2018 IBCPC in Florence.

=== United Kingdom ===
Dragon boat racing for breast cancer survivors was introduced to the UK by Eve Elliott Pearson in Liverpool.

Lagan Dragons Northern Ireland formed in 2015, the first cancer survivors' dragon boat team in Northern Ireland. They are based at Belfast Boat Club.

Manchester Dragoneers paddle on their boat Annie at Debdale Park, Manchester every week. Members of the group took part in the international dragon boating festival in Florida in 2018.

Oxford Paddlers For Life was founded in Oxford in 2017 and paddles on The Isis in Oxford.

Paddlers for Life Windermere is based on Windermere in the Lake District and was founded in 2007. It is a CIO. A group of members took part in the Thames Diamond Jubilee Pageant in June 2012 in their boat Artemis Diana.

Paddlers for Life Scotland South West was formed in March 2010 and is based on Loch Ken, Dumfries and Galloway.It is a registered charity.

Pink Champagne are a team based in Bournemouth, Dorset, who train on the River Stour.

Pool of Life was the first UK dragon boat team for breast cancer survivors, founded in 2004 with the help of Liverpool's Amathus Dragon Boat Club. It is based in Liverpool and a registered charity.

Port Edgar Dragons from Port Edgar, South Queensferry, near Edinburgh, bought their first boat in 2011 and are a registered charity.

Wave Walkers train at Docklands Sailing and Watersports Centre, Docklands, London, and Longridge Activity Centre, near Marlow. From small beginnings in 2012, the team now has a strong core and took part in Vogalonga, an annual non-motorized boat event, in Venice in 2014 and 2015.

The Wigan Water Dragons are based in Wigan and train on Scotsman's Flash. They launched their first full-sized boat in June 2011.

The Worcester Busters part of Worcester Dragon boat Racing Club train on the River Severn in Worcester, England, and took part in the Thames Diamond Jubilee Pageant.

=== United States ===
Hearts of Steel was established in 2017 within the Three Rivers Rowing Association in Pittsburgh, PA. Their mission is to empower all breast cancer survivors to strengthen their mind, body and spirit through camaraderie and the sport of dragon boating.

Chemo-Kazes Dragonboat Team, Non-profit Raleigh Dragon Boat Club's first survivor and their friends team of dragonboat paddlers. Est in 2018, they also accept survivors with any other illnesses. They paddle at Lake Wheeler Park in Raleigh, NC and take part in the Greater Triangle Dragon Boat Festival held every year in September at Koka Booth Amphitheatre in Cary NC.

Dragonheart Vermont's Sisters and Soul Sisters breast cancer survivor teams were established in 2004 in Burlington, Vermont. The 200 members make up 10 teams and organize the annual Lake Champlain Dragon Boat Festival.

KC Pink Warriors, Kansas and Missouri's first full-time dragon boat team, was established in April 2019. They practice at Wyandotte County Lake in Kansas City, Kansas. They are a registered 501(c)(3) Charitable organization.

Orlando Warriors on Water, Central Florida's only Breast Cancer Survivor Dragon Boat team, was established in 2009. They practice on Lake Fairview in Orlando. They are a registered 501C3 Charitable organization.

Machestic Dragons, New Jersey's first Breast Cancer Survivor Dragon Boat team, was established in 2005. They practice on Mercer Lake in West Windsor, New Jersey. Paddle for Pink is their annual dragon boat festival, held each June in Mercer County Park.

GoPink!DC, a breast cancer survivor team in Washington, D.C.

Save our Sisters, Miami, South Florida's first Breast Cancer Survivor Dragon Boat Racing team.

Wellness Warriors, Boston, MA, an all-cancer survivors (ACS) team, founded in 2007.

Pink Phoenix, of Portland, Oregon, launched in January 1997.

Annapolis Dragon Boat Club in Annapolis, Maryland, formed in 2011, competes in several dragon boat races, including the 2014 ICBPC Festival in Sarasota, Florida.

Dragon Boat Atlanta in Atlanta, Georgia, formed in 2004, took first place in the 2007 Peachtree City festival, and competed in the 2014 ICBPC Festival in Sarasota, Florida.

Pink Steel, a breast cancer survivor team within the Steel City Dragons organization in Pittsburgh, Pennsylvania, won the 2010 U.S. Dragon Boat Federation Club Crew Nationals for the BCS division

Los Angeles Pink Dragons, a breast cancer survivor team in Long Beach, California

Pink Phurree, Texas' first breast cancer survivor team in Houston / Clear Lake, Texas, and competed in the 2014 ICBPC Festival in Sarasota, Florida.

Live Love Survive, a co-ed cancer survivor team in Foster City, California

Lighthouse Dragons, a breast cancer survivor team in Jupiter, Florida with a supporter team – Jupiter United

Breast of Texas , a breast cancer survivor team in Grapevine, Texas

Indy SurviveOars, a breast cancer survivor team in Indianapolis, Indiana

Against the Wind, of Philadelphia, We are the first BCS dragon boat crew on the Schuylkill River in Philadelphia, Founded in 2001.

Prairie Dragon Paddlers, of Champaign County, Illinois. This is the first BCS team in the State of Illinois, Founded in 2014.

Pink Dragon Ladies®, Tampa Bay, Florida. Founded in 2004, the "Pinks" are the first cancer survivor dragon boat team in Florida. Together with "Save Our Sisters-Miami," they co-hosted the 2014 IBCPC International BCS Festival in Sarasota, FL.

Heart & Soul Dragon Boat Team – a breast cancer survivor and supporter mixed team located in Melbourne, Florida, formed in 2014. Part of the Space Coast Dragon Boat Club. Competed in the 2014 ICBPC Festival in Sarasota, Florida. Won 3 Gold medals in 2017 SRDBA Southeast Championships, Women's B Division.
