= Eli Lieb (album) =

Studio album by Eli Lieb
- Released: October 25, 2011
- Recorded: 2010–2011
- Genre: Pop; Electronic music
- Length: 36:00
- Language: English

Eli Lieb is the debut album from the American pop singer-songwriter, Eli Lieb. The album was self-produced and self-released on October 25, 2011.

== Background ==
Lieb began to write and compose the album after the success following his covers on YouTube. When speaking to Out magazine about the first album's concept in comparison to his upcoming second album, Lieb said:

It definitely still has the same electro-pop feel, but there is a little more acoustic stuff in there. I feel like it is just more, mature. I think as an artist you keep on evolving and growing and learning more, and I think that this album, I approached it in way were I knew a lot more than I did for the first album.

One single was released from the album, titled "Place of Paradise" on September 8, 2011.

== Track listing ==
No.	Title	Length
1.	"Red"	1:53
2.	"All I Wanted"	4:16
3.	"Place of Paradise"	3:34
4.	"Tightrope"	3:55
5.	"Tidal Waves"	4:14
6.	"We Own the Beat"	3:25
7.	"Ghost"	3:22
8.	"Red and Blue"	4:13
9.	"Call It a Day"	3:16
10.	"Undone"	4:12
