= Eli Lieb =

American pop singer-songwriter

- Born: Elias Howard Lieb; Iowa, United States
- Origin: Fairfield, Iowa
- Genre: Pop
- Occupation: Singer-songwriter
- Label: Eli Lieb
- Website: www.elilieb.com

Eli Lieb /ˈiːlaɪ liːb/ is an independent American pop singer-songwriter from Fairfield, Iowa. In 2014, Lieb resided in Los Angeles, where he was working on his second album.

== History ==
At twenty, Lieb left his hometown of Fairfield, Iowa, to pursue music professionally in New York City. In addition to attending classes at The New School and at Pepperdine University, Lieb began singing at local open mic sessions, where he was introduced to Jonathan Daniel of Crush Management. The two began meeting with record labels, and Lieb began collaborating with other songwriters. During this period, Lieb's father died; he abruptly ceased his music career and moved back to Fairfield. For more than three years, he did not play or write a song.

=== 2009–2011: Debut album ===
In 2009, Lieb began recording covers of popular songs and uploading them to YouTube from his home in Fairfield. His videos accrued a large number of views while the positive response he received online encouraged him to release his first album, the self-titled Eli Lieb, independently on October 25, 2011. Lieb wrote, recorded, and produced the album on his own in Fairfield.

=== 2013–present: Post-debut singles and second studio album ===
Lieb's single "Young Love" was released in July 2013, with music blog Idolator calling it "an instantly catchy, uplifting pop/rock anthem that sounds like a cross between Katy Perry and Bruce Springsteen". In October 2013, Lieb's YouTube cover of Miley Cyrus's "Wrecking Ball" went viral and was supported through social media by singers Adam Lambert and Lucy Hale.

In 2014, Lieb released a free digital download titled "Safe In My Hands" in conjunction with Allstate's #OutHoldingHands campaign. The song was performed and co-written by Lieb and was featured in a short animated film for the same campaign. "Safe In My Hands" was also featured in the Season 2 summer finale of ABC Family's The Fosters and won "Best In Show" and "Best Original Song" at the 2015 American Music Producers Awards for Music and Sound.

On July 8, 2014, Lieb released a single "Zeppelin" produced by John Feldmann. The accompanying music video was released on July 15 and was directed by Geoff Boothby.

On September 13, 2014, Lieb performed "Young Love" at the GLAAD Gala San Francisco: Game Changers event for LGBT equality through the media.

Lieb went on to release the single "Lightning in a Bottle", also produced by Fieldman, and its accompanying music video on November 19, 2014. He went on to work on a second album with Feldmann as producer. As of March 2023, he has almost 58 million views on his YouTube channel.

== Songwriting ==
In 2013, Lieb moved to Los Angeles to further his career as a songwriter. He has collaborated with artists including Crystal Bowersox, Cheyenne Jackson and Adam Lambert.

In 2015, Lieb has written with musical acts such as Hey Violet and Laura Marano alongside writing partner Stacy Jones.

In March 2016, Eli and singer-songwriter Steve Grand co-wrote a duet, "Look Away". By June 2019, the music video had received over 2,300,000 views on YouTube.

On June 13, 2016, two days after the Orlando nightclub shooting, Lieb and Brandon Skeie co-wrote a song named "Pulse" and released it in memory of the victims in the shooting.

== Personal life ==
Lieb is openly gay, a subject that is frequently featured in his songs and music videos.

Lieb comes from a meditating family and has been practicing Transcendental Meditation since childhood. He credits it with allowing him to "freely create the music that I am creating without any fear". He has worked with the David Lynch Foundation to fund teaching of Transcendental Meditation.

== Discography ==
=== Album ===
Title
Album details
Track listing
Eli Lieb
- Released: 25 October 2011
- Format: CD, digital download

Standard edition
No.	Title	Length
1.	"Red"	1:53
2.	"All I Wanted"	4:16
3.	"Place of Paradise"	3:34
4.	"Tightrope"	3:55
5.	"Tidal Waves"	4:14
6.	"We Own the Beat"	3:25
7.	"Ghost"	3:22
8.	"Red and Blue"	4:13
9.	"Call It a Day"	3:16
10.	"Undone"	4:12

The Nights We Lived
- Released: 27 April 2018
- Format: CD, digital download

Standard edition
No.	Title	Length
1.	"Fall for You"	4:58
2.	"Round and Round"	3:19
3.	"Until You've Fallen Down"	3:16
4.	"Kissing Your Tattoos"	3:08
5.	"When You Need a Friend"	3:32
6.	"Next To You"	2:54
7.	"Shangri La"	4:01
8.	"Hollywood"	3:48
9.	"Castles"	3:02
10.	"The Nights We Lived"	4:09
11.	"Round and Round (Future Gangster Remix)"	3:33
12.	"Next to You (Future Gangster Remix)"	4:24
13.	"Hollywood (Future Gangster Remix)"	4:43

=== Singles ===
Title	Year	Album
"Place of Paradise"	2011	Eli Lieb
"Young Love"	2013	—N/a
"Safe in My Hands"	2013	—N/a
"Safe in My Hands" (pop remix version)	2013	—N/a
"Zeppelin"	2014	—N/a
"Lightning In A Bottle"	2014	—N/a
"Look Away" (with Steve Grand)	2016	—N/a
"Pulse" (feat. Brandon Skeie)	2016	—N/a
"Shangri La"	2017	The Nights We Lived
"Kissing Your Tattoos"	2017	The Nights We Lived
"Until You've Fallen Down"	2017	The Nights We Lived
"Next To You"	2017	The Nights We Lived
"The Nights We Lived"	2018	—N/a
"I Want It All"	2019	—N/a
"Boys Who Like Boys"	2021	—N/a

== Music videos ==
Title	Artist	Director(s)
"Place of Paradise"	Eli Lieb	Geoff Boothby and Nicholai Fischer
"Young Love"	Eli Lieb	Geoff Boothby
"Safe In My Hands"	Eli Lieb	Allstate
"Zeppelin"	Eli Lieb	Geoff Boothby and Sharkpig
"Lightning In A Bottle"	Eli Lieb	Geoff Boothby and Sharkpig

== Soundtracks ==
Title	Year	Film
"One in a Million"	2020	Ghosts of The République

== Awards and nominations ==
Year	Presenter	Award	Result
2015	American Music Producers Awards for Music and Sound	Best Original Song ("Safe in My Hands")	Won
2015	American Music Producers Awards for Music and Sound	Best in Show ("Safe in My Hands")	Won
