= Vogalonga =

Water sport event in Venice, Italy

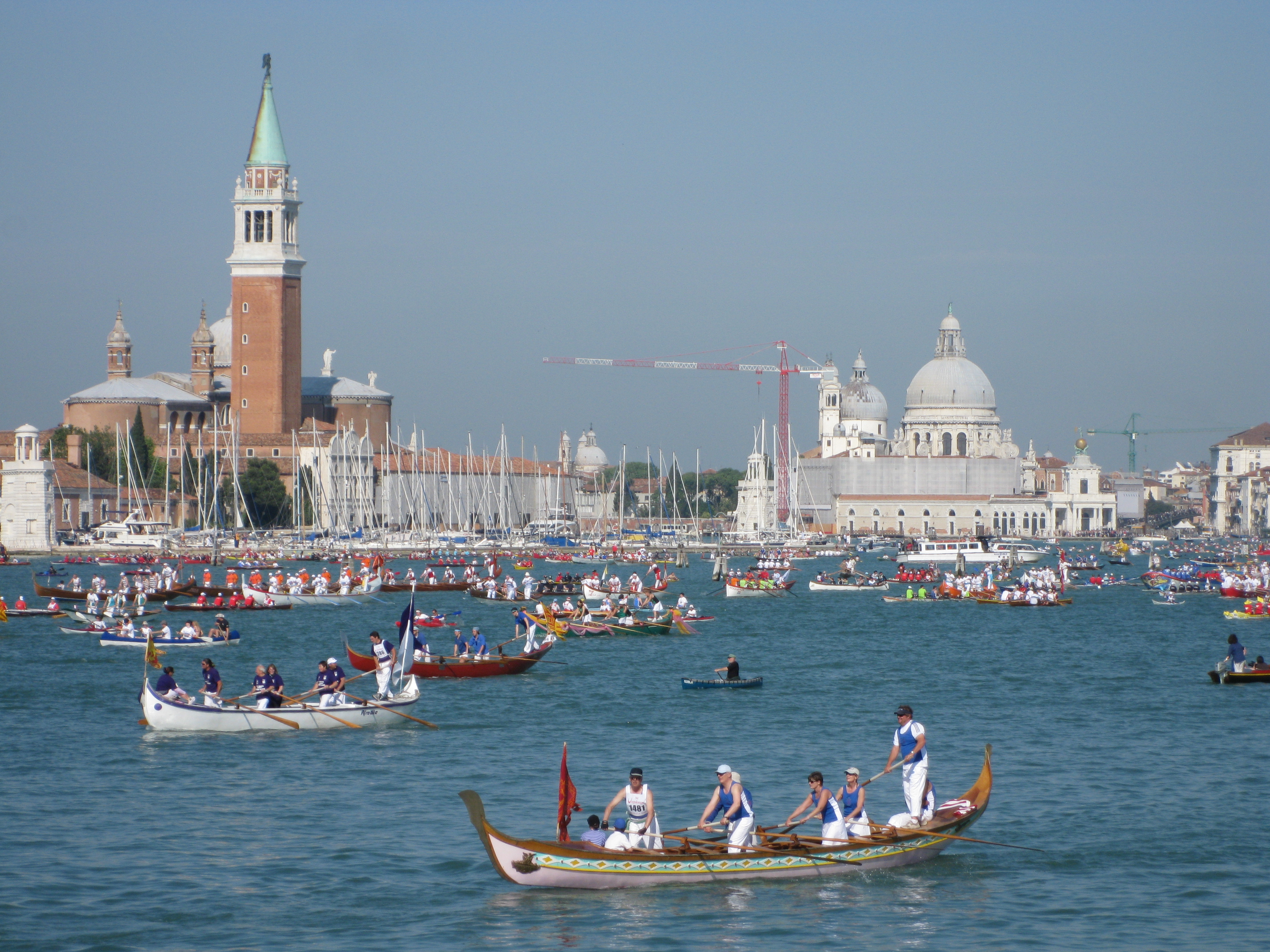

Vogalonga is a rowing regatta in the Italian city of Venice.

On November 11, 1974 a group of Venetians, both amateur and professional rowers, had a race in the island of Burano. They came up with an idea of non-competitive "race" in which any kind of rowing boat could participate, in the spirit of historical festivities. The first Vogalonga began the next year with the message to protest against the growing use of powerboats in Venice and the swell damage they do to the historic city.

Participants gather in St Marks Basin in front of the ducal palace. They sing hymns to San Marco (Saint Mark) and begin the "race". The racecourse is scenic route 30 kilometers long along the various Venetian canals and historical buildings.

Each participant receives a commemorative medal and a certificate of participation. They may also receive a prize, chosen randomly, which are often trophy cups and plaques, decorative oars and other mementos local associations, newspapers and the organizing committee have donated.

The numbers of participants has swelled to thousands over the years from all over the world. Some locals have founded new rowing clubs and build their own boats based on real, historical watercraft. Some participants have brought their own kind of boats like the Chinese dragon boats. Some have also chosen to swim through the route instead of rowing.

The 2009 Vogalonga event became a small scale disaster, with strong winds overturning several rowboats and 50 people had to be pulled from the water, although police and fire service motorboats were quick on the scene and nobody was seriously injured.
