= Steve Grand =

American singer-songwriter

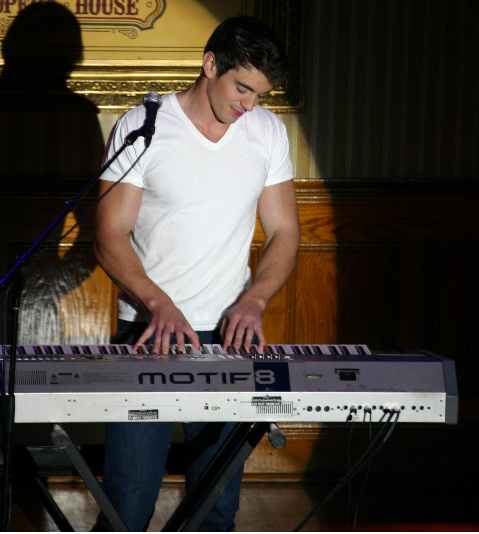
- Steve Grand at the Come Out With Pride in October 2013

Background information
- Also known as: Steve Chatham; Steve Starchild
- Born: February 28, 1990 (age 36); Lemont, Illinois
- Genres: Pop rock, country, crossover
- Occupations: Model, musician, singer, songwriter
- Instruments: Vocals, piano, guitar
- Years active: 2011–present
- Label: Grand Nation
- Website: www.stevegrand.com

Steve Grand (born February 28, 1990) is an American singer, songwriter and model from Lemont, Illinois, a Chicago suburb. He became an overnight internet celebrity and the music video of his first hit "All-American Boy" went viral on YouTube in less than a week in July 2013. This attention landed Grand on Good Morning America, CNN and other national media. In addition to being a musician, Grand has become an active figure in the LGBT equality movement. He released his debut album titled All American Boy financed by a successful Kickstarter public funding campaign. The follow-up album Not the End of Me was released in 2018.

== Life and career ==
=== 1990–2010: Early life ===
Grand grew up in the town of Lemont, Illinois, which he has "lovingly described as one of the 'blandest suburbs outside of Chicago'."

Grand started writing music when he was 11 years old. After graduating from Lemont High School, Grand attended Belmont University in Nashville, Tennessee, for a year. He then returned to Chicago to enroll at the University of Illinois and later left to focus on his musical career.

Grand cites a wide range of musical influences, including: The Beatles, The Rolling Stones, Led Zeppelin, Neil Young, Bruce Springsteen, Elton John, Billy Joel, Blink-182, Green Day, Taking Back Sunday, Brand New, Lady Gaga and Fall Out Boy. Grand told QVegas: "But it was Dad who got me started. He would listen to a song and tell stories about what each song meant to him: where he was in life, who he was dating, what car he was driving. He made me realize the lasting power of music -- how a great song can take you back to the moment you first heard it. From that point on, I knew that's what I wanted to do in life, create something so real and beautiful that it stays with its listener forever."

=== 2011–2015: Career beginnings and All American Boy ===
Prior to launching his musical career, Grand modeled under a number of pseudonyms; he was a cover model for Australia's DNA magazine in 2011 with a photo session shot by photographer Tom Cullis. He played piano at four Chicago-area churches and at various clubs in Chicago, most notably The Joynt in downtown Chicago, until 2013. He also performed cover songs, including hits by Lady Gaga, Bruno Mars, One Direction and Journey, and uploaded these to YouTube under the name Steve [Starchild]. However, Grand wanted to release original music.

On July 2, 2013, Grand uploaded a music video for his song "All-American Boy" to YouTube—producing it himself at a cost of US$7,000. The video almost immediately went viral. Just eight days later, "All-American Boy" had more than 1 million views. The song, set against a backdrop of country roads, an American flag and friends around a campfire, tells the story of a young man in love with a heterosexual male friend. Grand recorded the vocals in his parents' basement and maxed out his credit card to self-fund the video. The video was directed and edited by filmmaker Jason Knade. BuzzFeed ranked the video for "All-American Boy" on its list of the "24 Most Brilliant Music Videos from 2013", and Out magazine named Grand to its annual "Out100" list of the year's most compelling LGBT people. On July 18, 2013, Grand made his television debut, performing "All-American Boy" on WLS-TV produced program Windy City Live.

Some media have claimed that Grand is the "first openly gay male country singer", although this has been disputed. Grand does not claim to be the first of his kind, and often talks with praise about the trailblazers who have come before him. Several gay male country musicians have toured gay bars and other venues for decades, beginning with Patrick Haggerty's band Lavender Country in 1972, and two months before Grand's video hit, The New York Times profiled openly gay singer/songwriter Shane McAnally, who has had charted songs as a vocalist in the past and is currently one of the most successful songwriters in the industry. Other openly gay or bisexual male vocalists who have had successful careers in the country music industry as songwriters or musicians have included Jimbeau Hinson, Drake Jensen, Mark Weigle, Brian Glenn, and Shane Stevens. Openly gay country star Chely Wright lauded Grand as "brave" in remarks to Michael Musto of Out.com, saying: "This is uncharted territory, as you know. I came out after having been in the business for years. He's trying to get into the business."

On a number of interviews and media appearances, Grand disputes himself being a country artist. In an interview with Time Out, New York in preparation for the launching of his debut album All-American Boy, he says: "There's a lot of talk about me being a country artist, and that was the headline from the start: Gay country artist. I never really identified with that — I certainly didn't put that out there myself, and I've never done anything to affirm that label. That was something that was just placed on me. I mean, I understand, [the song] "All-American Boy" does sound country, and the video is certainly very country. But there's stuff that's very dance-pop with not a trace of country on the record. So I think that will surprise people. But I'm a songwriter, and I've always been much more concerned about just the basic elements, the lyric and the melody rather than the production." Metrosource wrote that All-American Boy has "disparate" song styles, but it "works as a cohesive unit - rarely seen today...."

On September 6, 2013, Grand released "Stay", the follow-up single to "All-American Boy". followed by "Time" in 2014.

He announced plans to release his debut album financed by a successful Kickstarter public funding campaign. Just one day after the launch, the original $81,000 goal had been reached and in within 5 days, double the original funding goal, and by close, $326,593 had been pledged by 4,905 backers. The album titled All-American Boy was released on March 24, 2015. Since releasing his first album, Grand has travelled across the United States performing at Gay Pride Festivals and supporting gay causes.

On June 20, 2014, Grand performed at the WorldPride Toronto 2014 opening ceremonies. Steve Grand performed during the ceremony along with Melissa Etheridge, Deborah Cox, and Tom Robinson. Toronto, with a population of approximately 6.4 million people, held 3 marches over 3 days: Trans march, Dyke march, and the WorldPride Parade.

In June 2015, Grand made his first trip to Europe as an Arts Envoy of the Bureau of Educational and Cultural Affairs for the U.S. State Department. He and his band promoted LGBT rights in Austria. While in Austria, he gave a talk and did a video for the local NGO "It Gets Better." He gave a concert hosted by the Tri-Mission Ambassadors at the residence of Ambassador Alexa Wesner, a concert for Vienna's LGBT community as well as a concert at the Pride festival in Graz. He also performed at Europride in Riga, Latvia.

In December 2015, Grand produced a bluesy and soulful reprise of Mariah Carey's "All I Want for Christmas Is You".

=== 2016–2018: Not the End of Me and acting ===
In March 2016, Grand and singer/songwriter Eli Lieb co-wrote a duet "Look Away". By November 2016 the music video had received over 1,000,000 views on YouTube.

In March 2017, Grand performed at the Gay Mardi Gras in Sydney, Australia and Gay Pride Tampa, Florida.

Grand made his acting debut in December 2017 on the web series "Falling for Angels" (a Here TV/Pride Media project).

During the summers of 2017 and 2018, Grand took up residence in Provincetown, Massachusetts, while performing weekly at the Art House.

Grand's second album, "Not the End of Me," was released on July 6, 2018. The music on this album reflects Grand's development as an artist and performer with a wide array of songs capturing his moods and personal experience. Not The End Of Me appeared at number 10 on the Billboard independent charts for the week of July 21, 2018.

== Personal life ==
By age 13, Grand had come to the realization that he was gay and struggled to gain acceptance of his sexuality within his Catholic family and faith. He came out to friends starting in eighth grade.

On Good Morning America Steve shared how difficult it was for him to come out to his parents as a high school student—saying with obvious emotion "I felt like I was a shame to my parents and that there was no way I could ever make them proud"․ When his parents learned of his homosexuality, they encouraged him to seek counseling that would last five years. While some have called his therapy conversion therapy, he has not. In an interview with Michael Musto of Out.com, Grand said: "I want to make it clear that it's been misrepresented that I went through what most people know as conversion therapy. I saw a Christian therapist who, among many other beliefs, believed I'd be happier in a straight life. He didn't shame me for being gay. Most of the focus, we weren't even talking about my sexuality. But certainly his belief that I'd be living a happier life as a heterosexual was indeed harmful. In no way, shape, or form ... do I condone ex-gay therapy. I think it's a horrible practice. There's no scientific basis for it. A person's sexuality is a part of who they are. And I certainly suffered for not having my sexuality affirmed."

He came out at age 19, and has attended the Chicago Gay Pride parade.

In June 2015, Steve was interviewed by Johnny McGovern and described his coming out process as well as his musical development through his first album.

In December 2015, Steve went public with his move toward sobriety.

== Activism ==
Grand has become an active figure in the LGBT equality movement. In addition to being a singer-songwriter and performer, Grand has performed at Pride events – and has partnered with The Human Rights Campaign The Anti-Violence Project, Bailey House, the GLSEN Respect Awards, Out & Equal Workplace Advocates and the March on Springfield for Marriage Equality.

In 2014, he was one of the performers at the opening ceremonies of WorldPride in Toronto, Ontario, Canada.

In June 2015, Steve Grand visited Riga, Latvia, to teach a master's class and to take part in the Europride festival that was held in the country's capital city.

== In popular culture ==
Steve Grand has become a media-sought figure as a gay young artist. In 2013, he appeared on Out magazine's "Out100" list of prominent LGBT people. He also appeared in 2013 on Instinct gay American magazine's cover as one of its "Leading Men".

In 2016, Grand was included in Out Magazine's 100 Most Eligible Bachelors. In May 2017 Steve was named the #3 most eligible Gay Bachelor by Attitude Magazine.

== Discography ==
- All American Boy (2015)
- Not the End of Me (2018)
