= All-American Boy =

Single by Steve Grand

from the album All American Boy
- Released: August 4, 2013
- Recorded: 2013
- Studio: Band House Studios; Sound Factory (Hollywood, California); The Bank (Burbank, California); Harmony Studios (West Hollywood, California); Parents' Basement (Lemont, Illinois)
- Genre: Country
- Length: 5:24 (album version); 4:34 (single version)
- Label: Grand Nation
- Songwriter: Steve Grand
- Producer: Aaron Johnson

Steve Grand singles chronology
"All-American Boy" (2013)	"Stay" (2013)

Music video
- "All-American Boy" on YouTube

"All-American Boy" is a song by American singer-songwriter Steve Grand. It was released on August 2, 2013 as Grand's debut single. The song's music video was uploaded to YouTube on July 2, 2013 and immediately went viral; just eight days later, the video had more than 1,000,000 views.

== Background ==
"The world never sees change until people say … I’m going to just do it. I have to do it. That’s why I went all in. I’m not going to play it safe. There’s no room in the world to play it safe. You have kids killing themselves. Sure, there’s been progress politically, but there’s all these rural places in America, especially, that are very homophobic."

—Steve Grand talking to the Los Angeles Times about his decision to be open with his sexuality in the song.

"All-American Boy" was written solely by Grand. The narrative of the song focuses on a gay man's unrequited love for a straight man, although Grand contends that the song is more broadly a "universal story of longing". In an interview with BuzzFeed, Grand explained that the song was inspired by negative experiences he encountered as a gay male throughout his adolescence, including conversion therapy. Grand further explained the meaning of the song:

I needed to do something to share the ache and share the pain that I've felt for most of my life. This is the story I wanted to tell. This is who I want to be. I owe that. I owe that to all the people who have felt this.

== Music video ==
=== Background ===
The music video was directed by Jason Knade at various locations in Wisconsin, also featuring cinematography by Brendan Leahy. The video was entirely financed by Grand for a cost of approximately $7,000, with the majority of actors in the video being Grand's friends. In an interview with the Los Angeles Times, Grand explained that "there was no Plan B" with the creation of the video, commenting that he maxed out his own credit card when financing the project. The video was uploaded to Grand's YouTube account on July 2, 2013. Grand described the release of the video as "very grass-roots", sharing the video on both YouTube and Facebook in hopes that it would go viral. Grand explained that the intention of the video was "me coming out as totally myself", in hopes that it would resonate with listeners. Following the release of the video, Grand said,

[The video has] really resonated for those people who haven’t had a voice. I feel this giant responsibility to be there for them, even if I’m never on the radio because people aren’t comfortable with a guy singing about a guy – or because I don’t write poppy enough music. ‘All-American Boy’ is hopefully just the very beginning of a career for me.

=== Synopsis and reception ===
The video almost immediately went viral. Just eight days later, "All-American Boy" had more than 1 million views. The song, set against a backdrop of country roads, an American flag and friends around a campfire, tells the story of a young man in love with a heterosexual male friend.

Although Grand has received mostly positive reaction to the song, some gay activists have criticized its content, with one stating that its message is that "Gay men drink too much, feel sorry for themselves, and come on to straight dudes when their girlfriends aren't around." Writing for Slate, J. Bryan Lowder had an even harsher take on the video, describing it as "woefully out-of-tune with the times. It's like something out of a homo smut story from before Stonewall", and adding "this particular narrative of the tantalizing straight guy and lovesick queen is so hackneyed in gay culture as to be laughable." Grand has said that he appreciates different perspectives regarding his work. In an interview with The New Civil Rights Movement, he also said: "When I made that video, I did not set out to make any statements about gay people other than what we share in common with our straight brothers and sisters—that sometimes you love someone you can’t have. I know that especially rings true for gay people who grow up in a heterosexual world."

== Live performances ==
Grand's first public performance of "All-American Boy" was held live at The Joynt in Chicago on July 6, 2013. He performed the song at his final two gigs at The Joynt on July 12 and 13. On July 18, Grand performed "All-American Boy" on the Chicago morning talk show Windy City Live.

== Credits and personnel ==
Credits and personnel are adapted from the All American Boy album liner notes.

- Steve Grand – writer, lead vocals, background vocals, piano, acoustic guitar, digital editing
- Aaron Johnson – producer, digital editing, engineering
- Zac Rae – keyboard
- Tim Pierce – guitar
- Jim McGorman – guitar
- Max Steger – opening guitar string bend, engineering
- Marc Slutsky – drums
- Sean Hurley – bass
- Chris Steffen – engineering
- Adrian Trujillo – assistant engineer
- Bill Mims – assistant engineer
- Dan Piscina – assistant engineer
- Sam Martin – assistant engineer
