= All American Boy (Steve Grand album) =

Studio album by Steve Grand
- Released: March 23, 2015
- Studios: Audio Design, San Diego; Band House Studios, Hollywood; Beaird Music Group, Nashville; Harmony Studios, West Hollywood; Mission Sound Recording, Brooklyn; Parents' Basement, Lemont; Signature Sound, San Diego; The Bank, Burbank; Vibeland Studios, New York
- Genres: Country, pop, pop rock
- Length: 53:16
- Labels: Grand Nation, Brody, Sony RED
- Producers: Danny Wells; The Elev3n; Itaal Shur; Aaron Johnson

Steve Grand chronology
All American Boy (2015)	Not the End of Me (2018)

Singles from All American Boy
- 1. "All-American Boy" Released: August 4, 2013; 2. "Stay" Released: September 4, 2013; 3. "Back to California" Released: February 26, 2014; 4. "Time" Released: November 4, 2014

All American Boy is the debut studio album by American singer-songwriter Steve Grand. It was released on March 23, 2015 independently by his imprint Grand Nation Music and was disseminated through Brody Distribution Group via Sony RED Distribution. The album's tracks feature genres spanning from mostly country to pop music, as well as rock music. In the making of the album, Grand took his musical influences such as Lady Gaga, Bruce Springsteen, and Sum 41 onto the album. Some tracks on the album express a celebration of a person's sexuality or identity, predominantly aimed to the gay community and also represents and reminiscences his younger life.

The album garnered mostly mild commendations from critics who lauded the album's content and production, many noting Grand's talent, also some tracks for its "radio-friendliness", and that some songs could relate to anybody no matter what sexual orientation. For such an independent release, the album was a moderate success, making its debut on the US Billboard 200 at No. 47 and its components charts Digital and Independent Albums charts at No. 19 and No. 3, respectively.

Grand financed his album with a Kickstarter online campaign, surpassing an expectation of USD $81,000 with $326,593 donated, making it the third most funded music project never to be affiliated with a major label in Kickstarter history. Prior to the release, Grand had released a total of four singles: "All-American Boy", "Stay", "Back to California", and "Time". He went on a promotion campaign for the album throughout 2012 to 2015 on TV talk shows, Gay Pride Parades, and numerous interviews.

== Background and development ==
The development of the record came to fruition after Steve Grand released his first music video "All-American Boy" in August 2013 on YouTube. The music video became a viral hit and led Grand to launch a crowdfunding campaign under Kickstarter to assist him on his debut studio album. The campaign was then expected to reach an estimate of $81,000 but unexpectedly surpassed the expectations with $326,593 pledged making it to become the third most funded music project never to be affiliated with a major label in Kickstarter history. The album was produced by Aaron Johnson, whom was best known for producing material for artists such as The Fray and Eve 6.

=== Influences and themes ===
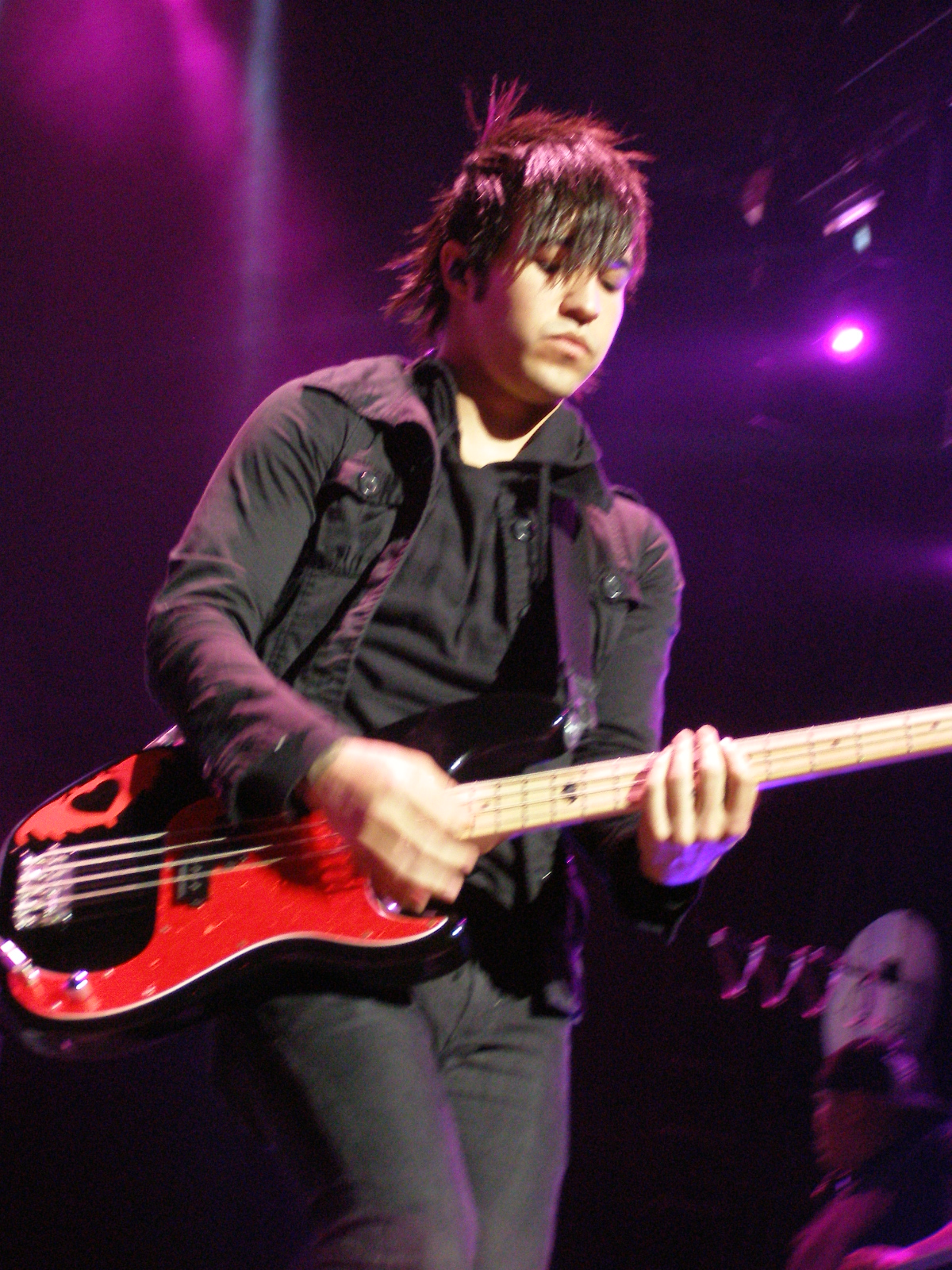
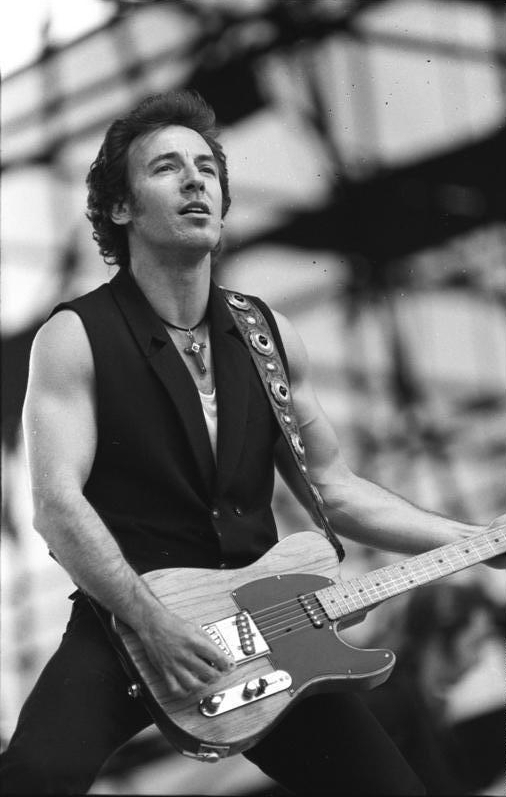
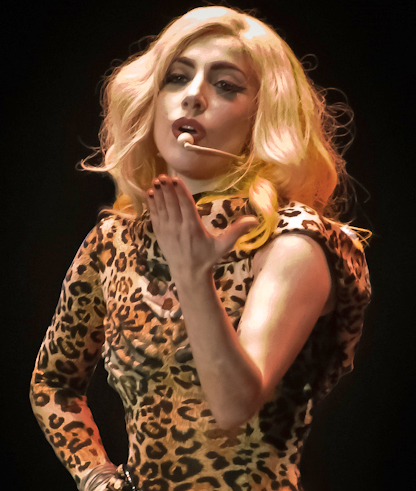
Steve Grand's influences on All American Boy were Fall Out Boy (left), Bruce Springsteen (middle), and Lady Gaga (right).

In a 2014 interview with The Advocate, Grand explained his feelings upon the process of the album: "While people say this is no big deal anymore. Who cares? You know who cares are the kids that are really struggling with this. The kids who feel like they would still rather be dead than live life as a gay person. I'm thinking about them all the time when I’m doing these things. Because deep down we really all just want to loved, we want to experience love, we want to give love, we want to take in love, and we want to feel valued and understood." He also added "It's not just about the album, it's a movement. I think a small pocket of people feel like I'm helping the voice [of LGBT people] be heard, and they’re making a statement by supporting the record."

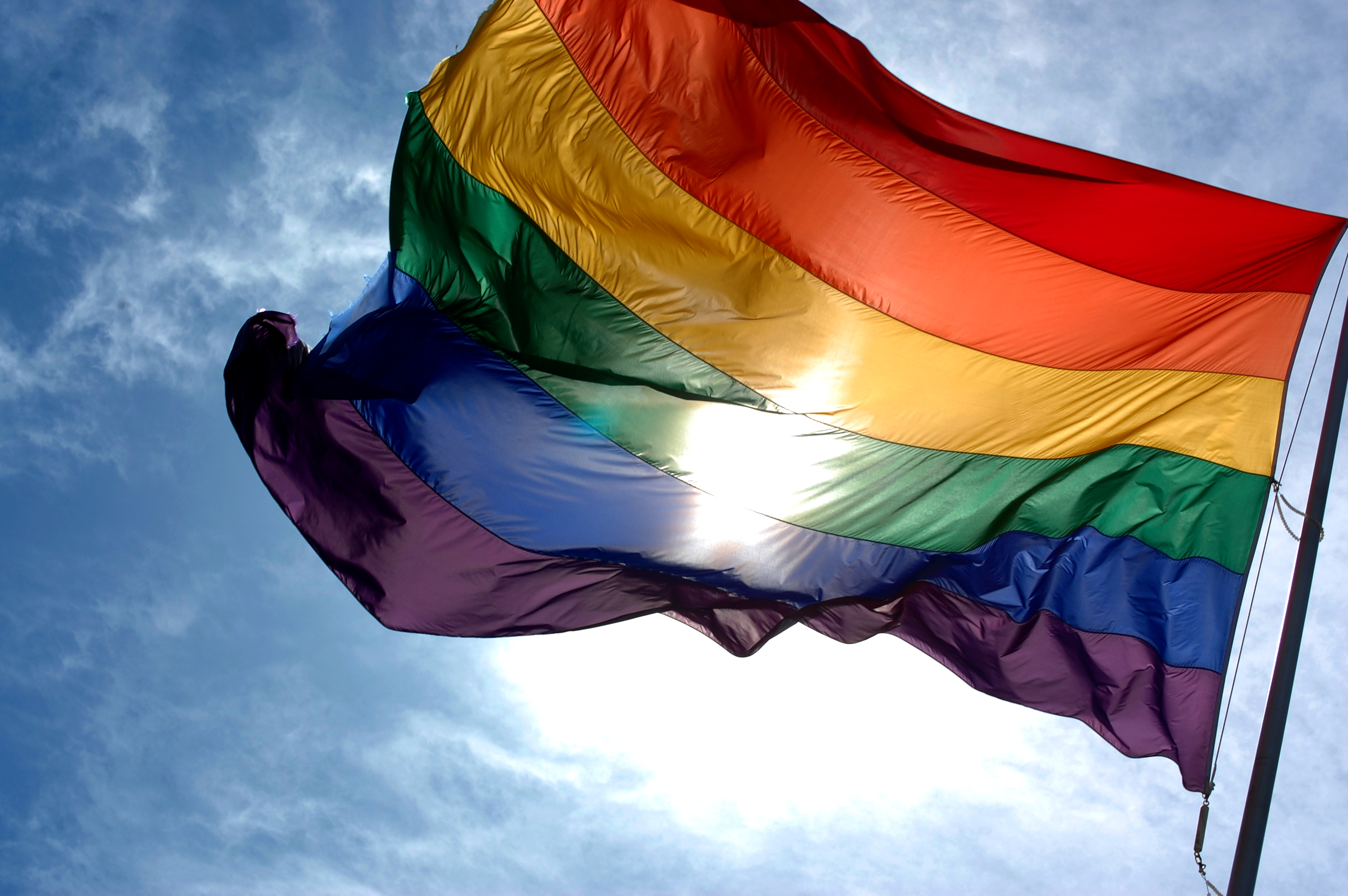
Grand was mostly reaching to the LGBT community and youth during sessions of the album.

Grand explained in an interview about the material selected for the album. "Each song needed to function as a plot point on that arc. A lot of things in life follow that trajectory, where there’s a beginning, middle, and end. Relationship do that, growing up does that, life does that." Every number, Grand adds, "explores some kind of relationship, whether it be a relationship with a romantic partner, a relationship with a friend, a relationship with the past, a relationship with something destructive, a relationship with a community."

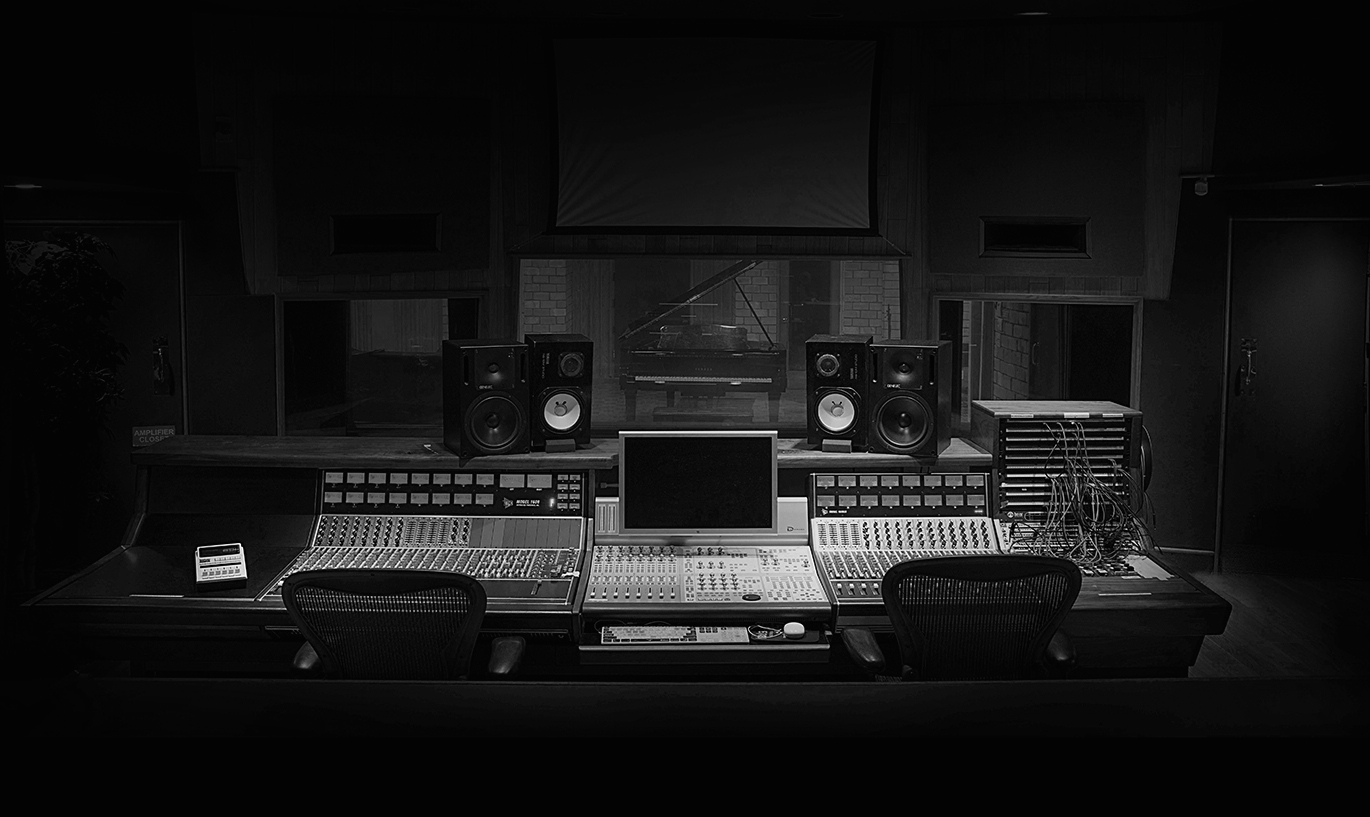
Parts of the album were recorded at Signature Sound Studios (pictured).

On an interview with ChicagoPride.com, Grand explained his inspiration behind the album "I named it All American Boy, not just because the song "All American Boy", but because when I was growing up, my dad would always pat me and my older brother on the head and brag to neighbors and friends, "These are my all-American boys. They're in Boy Scouts, they get good grades, they play sports, they build treehouses. They're just your typical all-American boys." That was an identity that he put on us, and that was something to be proud of. When I realized I was gay, it occurred to me that I no longer fit into what it typically meant to be an all-American boy. So me, naming my record All American Boy is kind of symbolic of me taking back an identity that I felt was kept from me because I was a gay person."

According to Grand himself, he stated that the album "represents the time in my life between 19 and 24, that awkward age between youth and adulthood," and that "features some of the themes you only experience during that time. It's not just an album of, 'Oh, he broke up with me, oh he loves me, oh I wish he loved me'. Those three songs are on there, but there are lots more."

In an interview with The Daily Beast, Grand also claimed that bands and singers such as Blink-182, Sum 41, My Chemical Romance, and Lady Gaga have all inspired him on the sound of the album, "I grew up listening to The Beatles, The Rolling Stones, Elton John and Billy Joel with my dad. We’d listen to the oldie station when we were driving in the car. Even before high school, I was getting into Blink-182, Sum 41, My Chemical Romance and all those kind of pop-punk and post pop-punk, all that sound really inspired me. And Fall Out Boy. Top 40s music inspires me too, country music inspires me. I did live in Nashville for one year when I was going to Temple University so I think that country sound and style of writing has worked its way into me a little bit and comes off in my music sometimes. And I love pop artists, I love Lady Gaga, I think she’s a great artist of our time." In addition, he's also influenced by Billy Joel, Fall Out Boy, and Bruce Springsteen, also most of the artists he grew up listening to.

== Release and reception ==
The album became available for pre-order on March 10, 2015. Steve Grand confirmed via Instagram that the album would be available through both digital download and on compact disc. According to iTunes, the album would bear a Parental Advisory warning label. BroadwayWorld.com confirmed the album is being exclusively distributed by Brody Distribution Group and RED Distribution, a division of Sony Music Entertainment. The album premiered on Billboard on March 17, 2015 via SoundCloud. All American Boy has produced a total of five singles to date: "All-American Boy", "Stay", "Back to California", "Time", and "Whiskey Crime", with the latter released as a promotional single supporting pre-orders of the album. On March 27, 2015, the music video for "Time" was released onto YouTube and features model Daniel Williams.

To promote and discuss about his new album, Grand performed live at a number of locations and talk shows including Hilton Hotels & Resorts, Wind City, MSNBC, and at gay pride events. He was also interviewed on Good Morning America, Larry King Now, The Huffington Post, CNN, and MSNBC.

=== Critical reception ===
Professional ratings
Review scores
Source	Rating
Digital Journal	A
SoSoGay Music UK	3.5/5 stars

All-American Boy was highly commended by contemporary critics. While praising Steve Grand's musical talent, Gregg Shapiro of ChicagoPride praised tracks such as "We Are the Night", "Better Off", and "Back to California". He also claimed that "Next to Me" and "Run" were radio-friendly. Upon "Back to California" he stated that the "emotion-packed power-ballad that is yet another examples of Grand's towering versatility." In a review of the record, Shapiro also wrote, "Grand wisely included the title cut, the song that first introduced him to his far-reaching and devoted followers. It also features 'Stay,' another song with which the Grand Nation (his fans) will be familiar. Among the new material the sexy 'Soaking Wet,' intoxicating 'Whiskey Crime,' dance-floor-destined 'Better Off' and the beautiful 'Back To California,' are all welcome additions to his repertoire."

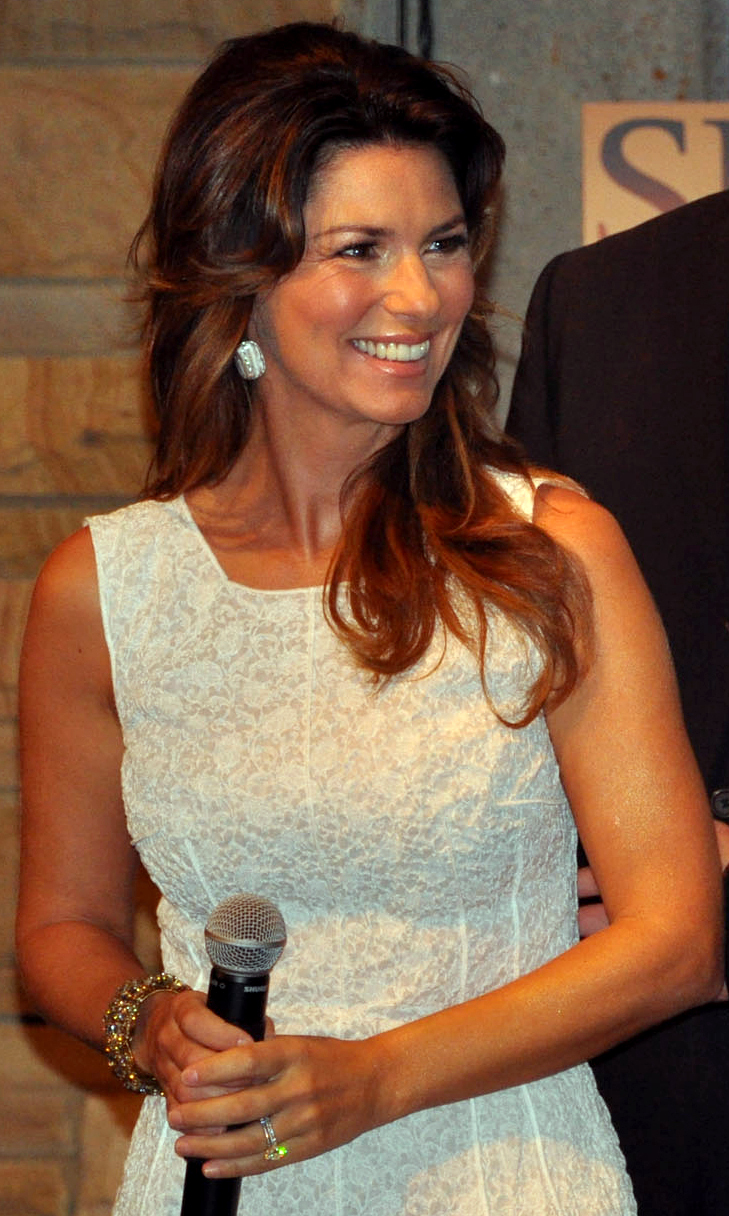
All American Boy was compared by critics to country singer Shania Twain's 1997 album Come On Over.

Markos Papadatos of Digital Journal lauded the album and praised tracks "Say You Love Me", "Red, White and Blue", "We Are the Night", "All-American Boy", "Soakin' Wet", "Lovin' Again", "Whiskey Crime", "Time", "Run", and "Back to California". He wrote "For Steve Grand fans the wait is finally over for his highly-anticipated breakthrough studio album, "All American Boy," and it is a superb studio effort." and also added "Overall, Steve Grand delights on his new studio album All American Boy. There is a lot of variety on the collection, and one can hear Grand's heart on every song. It may have taken a while to record, but it was well worth the wait, since excellence takes time, and Grand has achieved that on this musical project." Markos Papadatos gave an A rating. David Clarke of BroadwayWorld lauded the album, saying that it consists of "strong love songs, gorgeously crooned ballads, and infectious pop-country anthems that listeneres of all walks of life can get lost in. Regardless of who you are, the universal human emotions expressed in these smartly penned lyrics are instantly relatable." Clarke praised tracks such as "Say You Love Me", "We Are the Night", "Whiskey Crime", "Soakin' Wet, "Next to Me", and "Time".

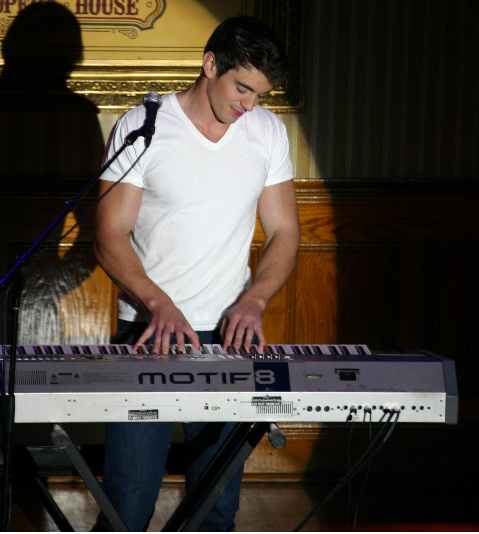
Grand's songwriting and vocal skills were generally praised.

Timothy Monger of AllMusic also lauded the album "With his passionate, powerful delivery and clever pop songcraft, Grand delivers 13 tracks of passionate, country-infused rock that should resonate with fans regardless of their sexuality." He also praised the two tracks "Red, White, and Blue" and "Whiskey Crime". Monger has yet to give a rating to the album despite his positive report upon the album.

Josh Haigh from SoSoGay UK gave a positive review and said that the album was "a country album at its heart" and said that "The album’s pop influences bring to mind Shania Twain’s iconic Come On Over, which famously managed to bridge the gap between country and pop and went on to become one of the best selling albums of all time." He claimed his assumptions on "Soaking Wet" saying, "whose subtle sexual-charged undertone – 'You can dry off later on/'Cos we're a little having too much fun/Being soaking we-e-et/Got you soaking we-e-et'" and called it one of the "album's instant standouts". He also said that the track "gives us a hint of what Grand's sound could potentially evolve into with future releases." Upon "Stay", Haigh says that it "sees him emulate indie-pop singer Ben Folds to great effect" and that "Whiskey Crime" is "equivalent of Come On Over’s 'Rock This Country!'". He claimed that it could be mistaken that "this was a major label debut from an up and coming country star". He also claimed similarities between Lady Gaga's 2011 hit single "Born This Way" and "We Are the Night". He ended with "However, at its core, All American Boy is a strikingly competent debut from one of the most promising mainstream LGBT artists to emerge in a long, long time." Hiagh gave 4.5 out of 5 stars for the album. Calan of Homorazzi gave an enthusiastic review, calling the album was "great body of work" and that "There is a perfect mix of upbeat fun pop-country tunes as well as those tragic ballads we all love to listen and cry to when life comes crashing down." He claimed that it reminded him of Canadian Idol runner-up Rex Goudie and his debut album Under the Lights (2005).

=== Commercial reception ===
The album debuted on the Billboard 200 at No. 47 and on the Independent Albums chart at No. 3. The record sold 10,000 copies in the week ending March 29, according to Nielsen SoundScan.

== Track listing ==
All tracks written by Steve Grand, except where noted. All tracks produced by Grand.

All American Boy track listing
No.	Title	Length
1.	"Say You Love Me"	3:49
2.	"Red, White and Blue" (Itaal Shur, Grand, Larry Dvoskin)	3:54
3.	"We Are the Night"	4:30
4.	"All-American Boy"	4:57
5.	"Soakin' Wet" (Grand, Andrew Allen)	3:15
6.	"Lovin' Again"	4:03
7.	"Whiskey Crime"	3:39
8.	"Stay"	4:55
9.	"Next to Me"	3:41
10.	"Time"	4:21
11.	"Better Off"	4:23
12.	"Run"	3:28
13.	"Back to California"	4:42

== Personnel ==
Credits adapted from the liner notes of All American Boy.

- Andrew Allen – composer, lyricist
- Joem C. Bayawa – photography
- Larry Beaird – guitar
- Jimmi K. Bones – guitar
- Bruce Bouton – steel guitar
- Steve Brewster – drums
- Mike Brignardello – bass
- Megan Jane Carchman – drums
- Daniel Crawford – digital editing, engineer, guitar, keyboards, producer, background vocals
- Jack Daley – bass
- Cassandra Dawson – photography
- Kyle Downes:– assistant engineer
- Mike Durham;– guitar
- Larry Dvoskin – composer
- The Elev3n – producer
- Michael Farrell – Hammond B3, strings
- Kirk Fisher – trumpet
- Jonathan Flaugher – bass
- Christopher Free – photography
- Debra Grand – photography
- Katie Grand – photography
- Steve Grand – composer, digital editing, acoustic guitar, lyricist, percussion, photography, piano, programming, backing vocals
- Bruce Howell – photography
- Sean Hurley – bass, upright bass
- Victor Indrizzo – drums, percussion
- Aaron Johnson – digital editing, engineer, producer, programming, backing vocals
- Rob Lane – engineer
- James LaRue – guitar
- Brendan Leahy – photography
- Sam Martin – assistant engineer
- Jim McGorman – guitar
- Bill Mims – assistant engineer
- Ben Moore – engineer
- James Gabriel Morales – composer, digital editing, drums, programming
- Matthew Morales – composer, digital editing, engineer, programming
- Kevin Morrison – photography
- Jimmy Nichols – keyboards
- Tim Palmer – mixing
- Tim Pierce – guitar, mandolin
- Éber Pinheiro – digital editing, engineer, mixing
- Daniel Piscina – assistant engineer
- Jackson Price – bass, photography, vocals (background)
- Alexandre Prol – guitar
- Zac Rae – keyboards
- Chris Ricchetti – executive producer, photography
- Dave Rodriguez – bass, composer, digital editing, guitar, programming
- Justin Shturtz – mastering
- Itaal Shur – composer, piano, producer
- Josh Sieh – assistant engineer
- Marc Slutsky – drums, percussion
- Kevin Sokolnicki – engineer
- Allan Spiers – photography
- Chris Steffen – engineer
- Max Steger – engineer
- Tony Swanson;– photography
- Russell Terrell – backing vocals
- Adrian Trujillo – assistant engineer
- Danny Wells – producer
- Steven Wolf – drums

== Charts ==
Chart performance for All American Boy
Chart (2015)	Peak position
US Billboard 200	47
US Digital Albums (Billboard)	19
US Independent Albums (Billboard)	3

== Release history ==
Release history and formats for All American Boy
Country/Region	Date	Format	Label	Reference
Japan	March 23, 2015	Compact disc	Grand Nation, Brody Distribution, RED Distribution, Sony	
United States	March 23, 2015	Compact disc	Grand Nation, Brody Distribution, RED Distribution, Sony	
Japan	March 24, 2015	Digital download	Grand Nation, Brody Distribution, RED Distribution, Sony	
United Kingdom	March 24, 2015	Digital download	Grand Nation, Brody Distribution, RED Distribution, Sony	
United States	March 24, 2015	Digital download	Grand Nation, Brody Distribution, RED Distribution, Sony	
Canada	March 24, 2015	Digital download	Grand Nation, Brody Distribution, Sony Music Canada	
