= International Dragon Boat Federation =

International governing body for dragon boat racing

- Map of the members of IDBF according to their confederation
- Abbreviation: IDBF
- Formation: 24 June 1991 (35 years ago)
- Type: Federation of national associations
- Headquarters: Hong Kong
- Region served: Worldwide
- Members: 82 national associations
- Official language: English, Cantonese, Mandarin Chinese
- President: Claudio Schermi
- Website: dragonboat.sport

International Dragon Boat Federation
- Traditional Chinese: 國際龍舟聯合會
Transcriptions

The International Dragon Boat Federation (Chinese: 國際龍舟聯合會) is the international governing body for the sport of dragon boat racing. IDBF was founded in Hong Kong on June 24, 1991 by Australia, China, Taiwan, Great Britain, Hong Kong, Indonesia, Italy, Malaysia, Norway, the Philippines, Singapore, and the United States. IDBF currently has 75 member countries or territories and is supported by five continental federations.

IDBF is a Member of the Alliance of Independent Recognized Members of Sport (AIMS).

IDBF organizes world championships each year: a World Nations Championships one year and a club Crew World Championships the next. These championships are held at venues within member countries.

== History of IDBF ==
Although the origins of the sport of dragon boat racing can be traced back at least 2,000 years, its origins as an international sport really only go back to the 1970s.

In 1976, the Hong Kong Tourist Association invited a crew from Nagasaki, Japan, to compete against nine Hong Kong fishermen crews as part of the annual racing at Shau Kei Wan. The objective was to help to promote Hong Kong as a tourist destination during the summer low season.

The event was a success and more and more international crews started to participate in the racing now held at East Tsim Sha Tsui. The local Hong Kong Amateur Rowing Association became involved and helped draft the first ever set of international race rules for dragon boats.

By 1991, several national dragon boat federations had been formed and it became clear that an international governing body ought to be established. So, on 24 June 1991, at a meeting in Hong Kong, the International Dragon Boat Federation was founded. The founding national federations were: Australia, China, Chinese Taipei (Taiwan), Great Britain, Hong Kong, Indonesia, Italy, Malaysia, Norway, the Philippines, Singapore, and the United States.

In 1992, IDBF published its first set of race rules and the technical specifications that would govern the boats and paddles used for racing.

In 1995, in Yue Yang, China, IDBF held its first World Nations Championships. Over 800 athletes representing 14 nations participated.

In 1996, in Vancouver, Canada, IDBF held its first Club Crew World Championships. This attracted over 250 athletes from 10 clubs from six nations.

Thereafter, the biennial sequence of World Nations Championships one year and Club Crew World Championships the next has been maintained (except for 2020 and 2021 when COVID prevented championships from taking place).

The sport has grown significantly since those early days and 30 nations (some 3,250 athletes) competed in the 2019 World Nations Championships and an incredible 140 clubs (some 6,200 athletes) competed in the 2018 Club Crew World Championships.

== Objectives ==
The objectives of the IDBF are to:

1. encourage the development of the sport of dragon boat racing;
2. maintain the sport’s cultural, historical, and religious traditions;
3. strengthen the bonds of friendship that unite those who participate in the sport;
4. be the solitary representation of dragon boating and Traditional Boat racing within international sports associations;
5. be the final authority for all international dragon boat and Traditional Boat racing championships;
6. deliver international championships;
7. establish and enforce competition regulations and rules for racing for international championships;
8. encourage the formation of governing organisations in countries where none exist;
9. promote inclusiveness in the sport;
10. achieve IOC recognition; and
11. see dragon boating as an Olympic sport.

== Mission ==
On the IDBF website, the IDBF notes that, "The IDBF shall observe the general and fundamental principles of the Olympic Charter and IOC Manual on sport and the environment."

The IDBF lists the following four principles of service to its members:

1. "To support and maintain the authority and autonomy of its Members and to promote closer links between its Members
2. To convey to other organizations the views of its Members and to co-ordinate and protect the common interests of its Members.
3. To collaborate, on behalf of its Members, with organization having as an objective the promotion of sport and particularly those paddle sports in which the use of the single bladed paddle is paramount. The IDBF Council may offer or countenance competitive events for watercraft, of any Design, propelled by a single blade paddle.
4. To collect, collate and circulate information form, to and among its Members and to publish an annual Calendar of IDBF sanctioned events."

== Executive committee ==
The IDBF Executive Committee, as of January 2023, consists of:

- President: Claudio Schermi (Italy)
- Senior Vice President: Raymond Ma (Hong Kong)
- 2nd Vice President: Matthew Smith (Canada)
- 3rd Vice President: Julie Doyle (Ireland)
- 4th Vice President: Nigel Bedford (Great Britain)
- 5th Vice President: Haigang Li (China)
- General Secretary: Peter Tang Tak Seng (Macau)
- Treasurer: Loretta Lewis (Australia)
- Deputy Treasurer: Franco Siu Chong (Trinidad and Tobago)
- Marketing & Media Commission: Belinda Chung (Australia)
- Competition & Technical Commission: Melanie Cantwell (Australia)
- Athletes Commission: Sue Holloway (Canada)
- Medical & Sports Science Commission: Bridget Walker (Switzerland)

== Members ==
There are 82 member nations of the IDBF. Classes of membership are Full, Ordinary, and Associate.

The 49 Full Members of the IDBF are:

Australia, Austria, Canada, China, Chinese Taipei, Costa Rica, Cyprus, Czech Republic, France, Germany, Ghana, Great Britain, Guam, Hong Kong, Hungary, India, Indonesia, Ireland, Italy, Japan, Macau, Malaysia, Moldova, Myanmar, Netherlands, New Zealand, Norway, Panama, Philippines, Poland, Portugal, Puerto Rico, Reunion Island, Senegal, Serbia, Singapore, Slovakia, South Africa, South Korea, Spain, Sweden, Thailand, Trinidad and Tobago, Turkey, Uganda, Ukraine, United Arab Emirates, United States of America, Vietnam .

The 33 Ordinary and Associate Members of the IDBF are:

Albania, Argentina, Armenia, Bahrain, Bangladesh, Belarus, Brunei, Bulgaria, Cambodia, Cameroon, Chile, Egypt, Estonia, Georgia, Greece, Guadeloupe, Iran, Israel, Ivory Coast, Jamaica, Kenya, Lithuania, Mauritius, Monaco, Mongolia, Nepal, Nigeria, Oman, Qatar, Romania, Russia, Somalia, Switzerland, Venezuela.

== Continental and affiliated federations ==
There are five continental federations recognised by IDBF. These federations govern dragon boat in their geographic areas, and organize their own regional/continental championships.

- Pan-American Dragon Boat Federation (PADBF), covering North America and South America.
- European Dragon Boat Federation (EDBF), covering Europe.
- Asian Dragon Boat Federation (ADBF), covering Asia.
- Oceania Dragon Boat Federation (ODBF), covering Oceania.'
- Dragon Boat Federation of Africa (DBFA), covering (Africa)

IDBF also recognises two federations as affiliated to IDBF:

- International Breast Cancer Paddlers Commission (ibcpc.com)
- International Ice Dragon Boat Federation (iidbf.com)

== IDBF Commissions ==
IDBF maintains the following commissions to assist it in the management of the sport (with the names in brackets after each the current chair of that commission):

- Athletes (Sue Holloway)
- Athletes Entourage (Barbara Michaels)
- Competition & Technical (Melanie Cantwell)
- Marketing & Media (Belinda Chung)
- Medical & Sports Science (Bridget Walker)
- Para Athletes (Keith Dalip)
- Sport for All (Li Hanjie)
- Women in Sport (Gitta Weberi)
- Youth (Wendi Zhou)

== Racing and competition classes ==
For all IDBF-sanctioned competition, teams are divided into the following racing classes by gender and age.

=== Racing classes ===
Open class: no restrictions on crew composition.

Women's class: crews must be all-female.

Mixed class: crews must comprise a mix of male and female athletes as set out in IDBF's race rules

Para Dragons class: two categories of racing (with no restrictions on age or gender):

→ PD1 - all paddlers must have a recognised impairment

→ PD2 - 50% of the paddlers must have a recognised impairment

Cancer paddlers: two categories of racing (with no restriction on age or gender):

→ Breast Cancer Paddlers (BCP) - all crew members must have had breast cancer

→ All Cancer Paddlers (ACP) - all crew members must have had cancer

=== Age classes ===
For the purposes of IDBF championships, a competitor's age is the age they would be on 31 December in the year of the competition.

IDBF provides racing for the following age classes:

Premier - no age restrictions

Junior class (note all paddlers must be over the age of 12, but the drummer and steerer can be older)

→ 18 and under

→ 16 and under

→ 14 and under

24 and under - for paddlers over the age of 12 and up to 24

Senior class

→ Senior A - 40 and over

→ Senior B - 50 and over

→ Senior C - 60 and over

=== Boat classes ===
Races are divided into two boat classes:

Standard boat: 20 paddlers plus the drummer and the steerer (helm), making the total crew 22.

Small boat: 10 paddlers plus the drummer and the steerer (helm), making the total crew 12.

=== Race distances ===
At IDBF championships, racing is conducted over the following distances:

200 metres

500 metres

1,000 metres

2,000 metres

== World Nations Championships (WNC) ==
The IDBF hosts the World Nations Championships, also known as the World Dragon Boat Racing Championships (WDBRC), every odd-numbered year. Each country fields one team per class. Athletes for these national teams are most typically chosen individually.

The IDBF Congress is also held in conjunction with each WDBRC.

A list of WDBRCs is below:

Number	Location	Year
1	Yueyang, China	1995
2	Hong Kong	1997
3	Nottingham, England	1999
4	Philadelphia, USA	2001
5	Poznan, Poland	2003
6	Shanghai, China	2004
7	Berlin, Germany	2005
8	Sydney, Australia	2007
9	Račice, Czech Republic	2009
10	Tampa, USA	2011
11	Szeged, Hungary	2013
12	Welland, Canada	2015
13	Dianchi Lake, China & Divonne-Les-Bains, France	2017
14	Pattaya, Thailand	2019
15	No championships due to COVID	2021
16	Pattaya, Thailand	2023
17	Brandenburg an der Havel, Germany	2025
18	Hong Kong, China	2027

== Club Crew World Championships (CCWC) ==
The IDBF hosts the Club Crew World Championships (CCWC) every even-numbered year. Unlike those competing at the WDBRC, teams at CCWC are already-established teams that represents each country in each class.

A list of CCWCs is below:

Number	Location	Year
1	Vancouver, Canada	1996
2	Wellington, New Zealand	1998
3	Rome, Italy	2000
4	Cape Town, South Africa	2002
(5)	(No event, due to SARS)	2004
5	Toronto, Canada	2006
6	Penang, Malaysia	2008
7	Macau	2010
8	Hong Kong	2012
9	Ravenna, Italy	2014
10	Adelaide, Australia	2016
11	Szeged, Hungary	2018
12	No championships due to COVID	2020
13	Sarasota, USA	2022
14	Ravenna, Italy	2024
15	Hualien County, Taiwan	2026

== Equipment specifications and licensing ==
As the global governing body of dragon boat, the IDBF determines official specifications for equipment and licenses companies to manufacture dragon boat equipment, including paddles and boats.

Licensed paddle manufacturers include: Braca Sports, Burnwater, Decathlon, Eclipse Innovations, Gray Owl, Hangzhoug Fuyang, Hornet Watersports, Kajner Sport, King Paddle, Kanoe Sports, Merlin Paddles, Trivium, Typhoon Limited, Wenzhou Yuansu Sport Co., and Zaveral Racing Equipment.

Licensed dragon boat manufacturers include: BuK, Champion, Shanghai Pei Sheng Boat Corporation, Foshen Ouyue Sports Equipment Co., Ltd, Hangzhou Rui Dragon Boat Co., Kim Tuck Huat Boat Builder, Wenzhou Yuansu Sport Co., Ltd.

== See also ==
- Hong Kong Tourism Board
- GAISF
