= Harrild =

Harrild may refer to:

- Robert Harrild, printing pioneer
- Harrild & Sons, British manufacturer of printing machinery and supplies
