= Harrild & Sons =

Harrild & Sons Limited
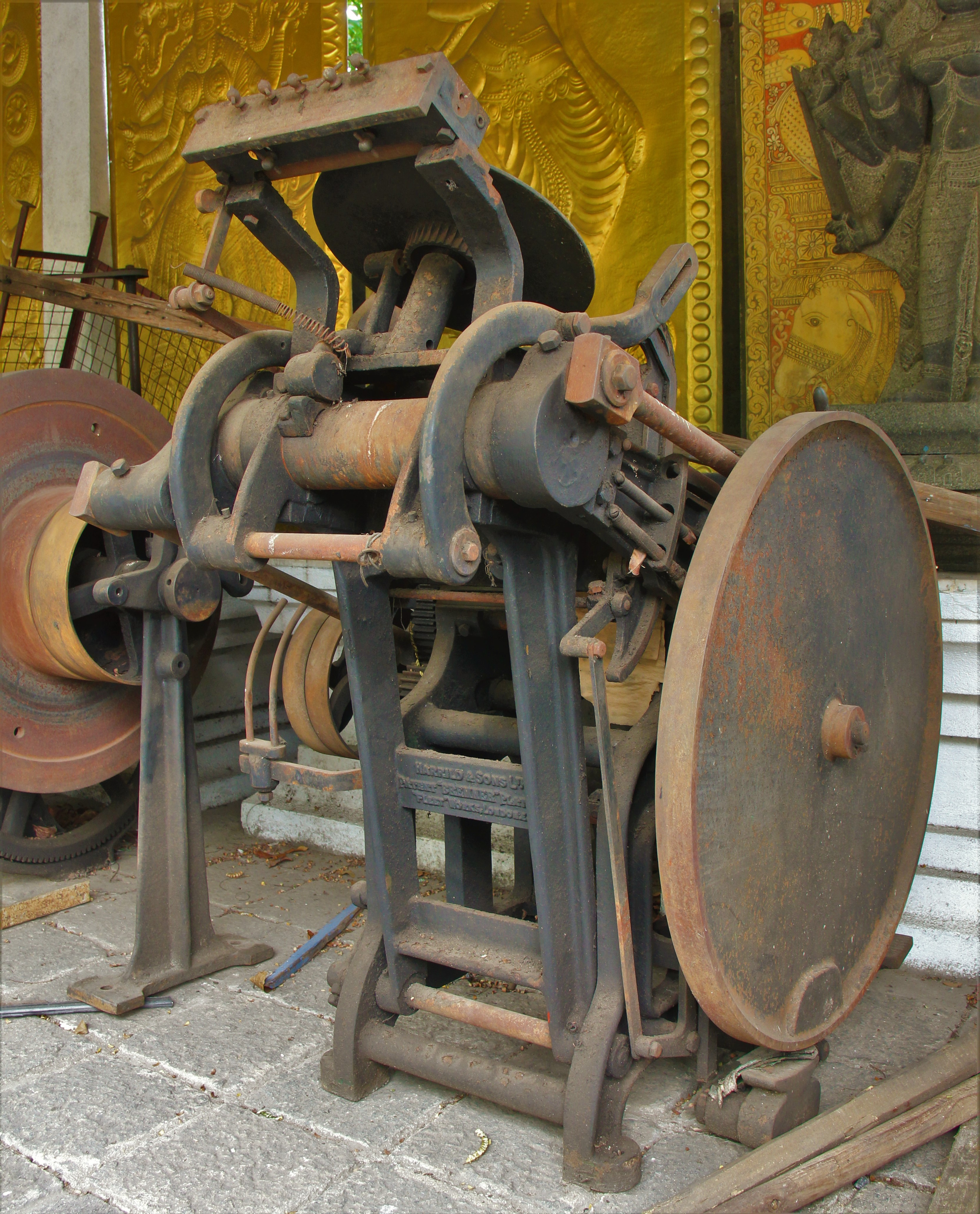
- Jobbing press manufactured by Harrild & Sons, on display outside the Gangaramaya Temple in Colombo
- Type: Public
- Industry: Manufacturing
- Founded: 1809; 217 years ago in London, United Kingdom
- Founder: Robert Harrild
- Defunct: 1949
- Fate: Defunct
- Headquarters: Norwich Street, London, United Kingdom
- Products: Printing press; Printing machinery accessories

Harrild & Sons Limited is a defunct British manufacturer of printing machinery and supplies. The company was founded in 1809 by Robert Harrild at Norwich Street, London, and closed down in 1949. The company helped to establish the use in London of composition rollers instead of ink balls to ink the printing plates.

== History ==
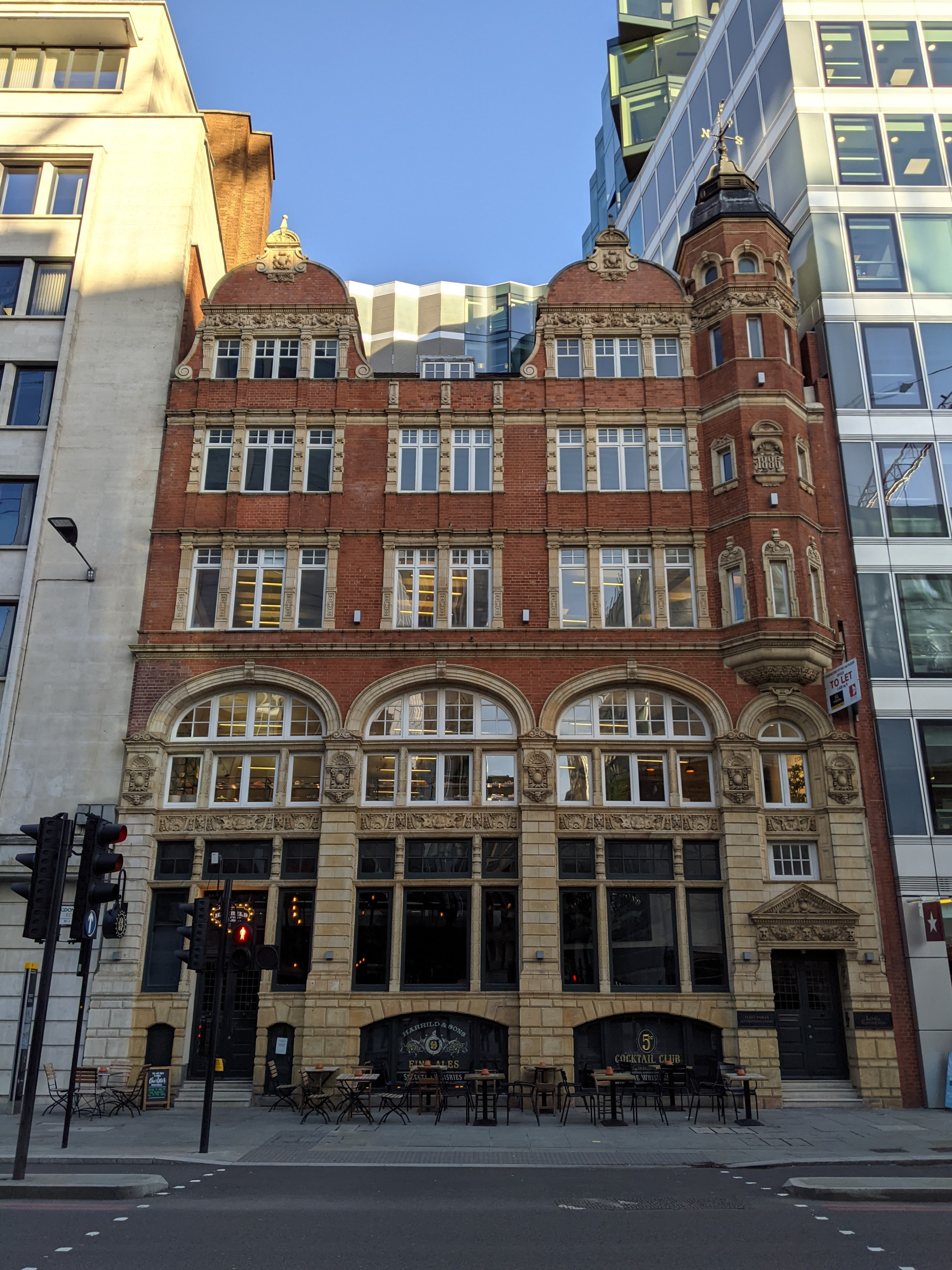
The former Harrild & Sons printing machinery works building on Farringdon Street is Grade II listed

Robert Harrild established the company Harrild & Sons Limited in 1809 in Farringdon, London. The company used to manufacture printing presses for letterpress printing. The company started manufacturing presses with ink balls (since the printing presses then used ink balls rather than composition rollers to ink the plates). In 1813, Harrild joined the discussion within the London printing community and talked about use of "composition rollers" instead of "ink balls" to ink the printing plates. The majority of hand printers preferred use of ink balls over composition rollers but after successful demonstration of Harrild's composition roller, every printer in London started using the composition roller. To manufacture the rollers, Harrild established another company at 25 Farringdon Street in London. Harrild & Sons eventually started manufacturing all kinds of printing equipment.

After his death in 1853, the company was operated by Robert Harrild's sons until it ceased operations in 1949.

The building in Farringdon street used the terracotta of Gibbs and Canning of Glascote, Tamworth.

== Products ==
Harrild & Sons Limited manufactured and marketed composition roller printing presses, paragon platen printing presses (Columbian, Albion and Jobbing presses), types, paper ruling machines, trimming machines, newspaper folding machines and other items connected with printing machinery.

The company's advertisements mentioned:

Harrild and Sons' Manufacture ... have on sale every article connected with printing machinery; type, presses, machines...

— Princeton University,

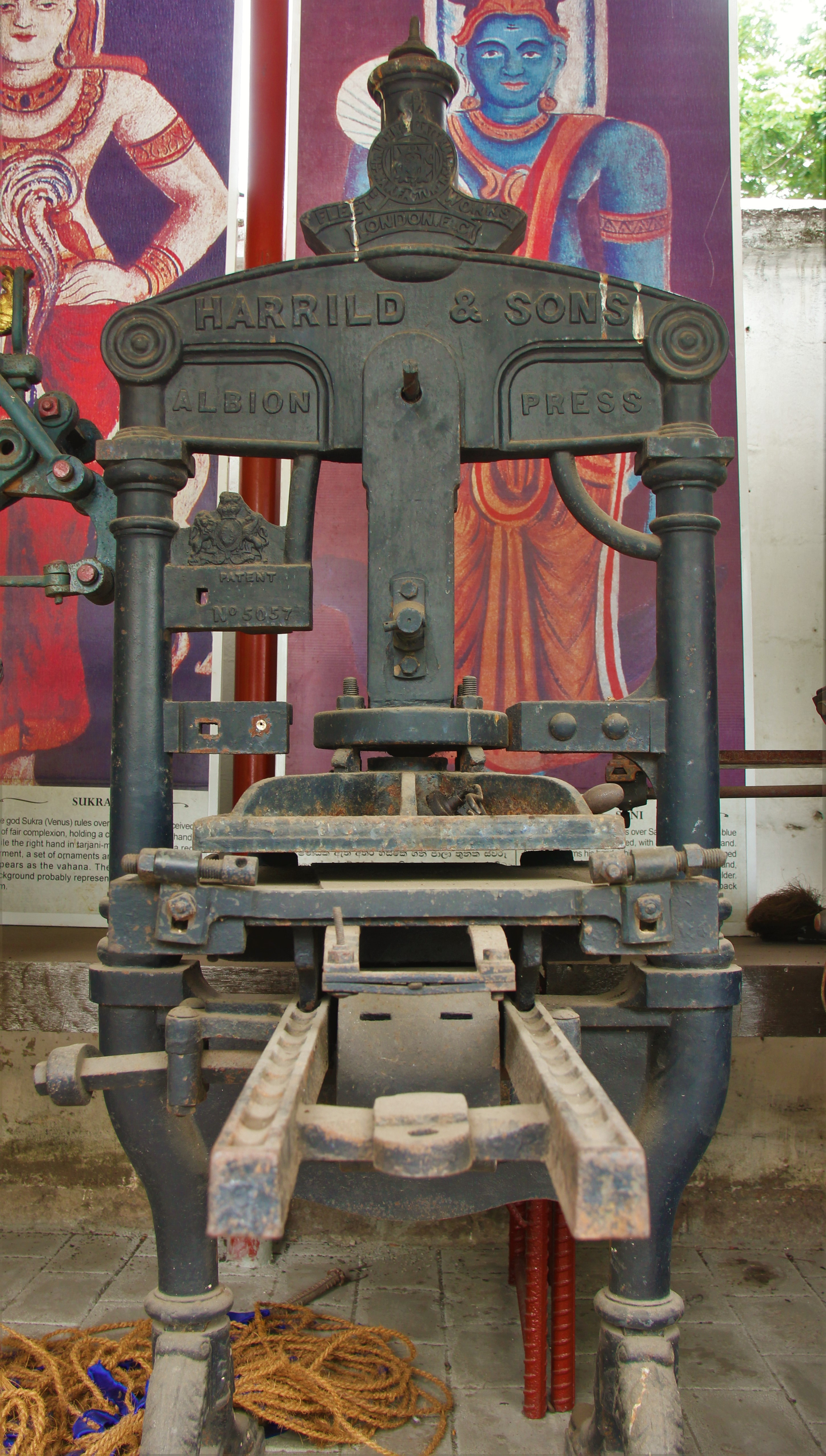
Albion press

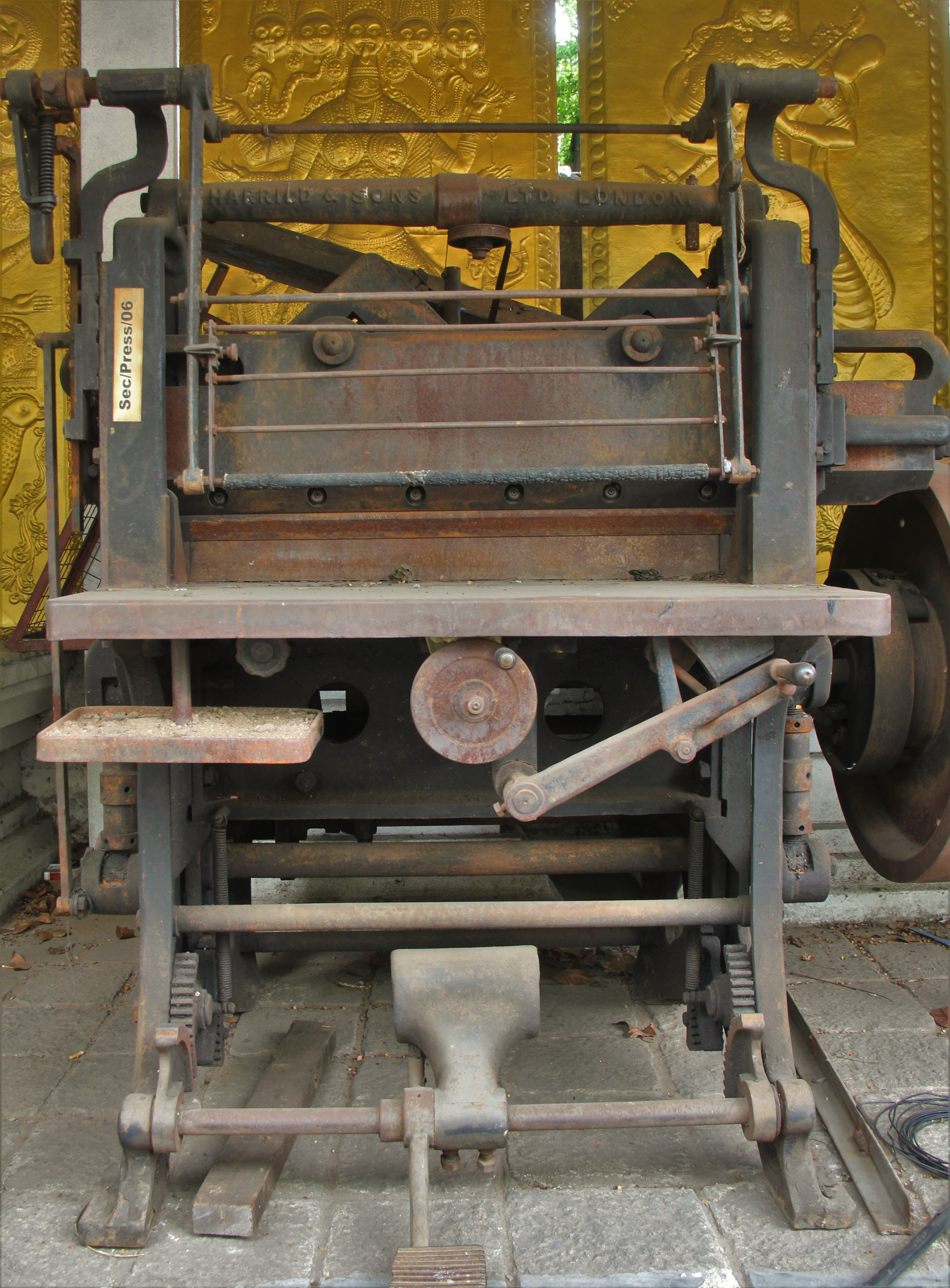
Jobbing press

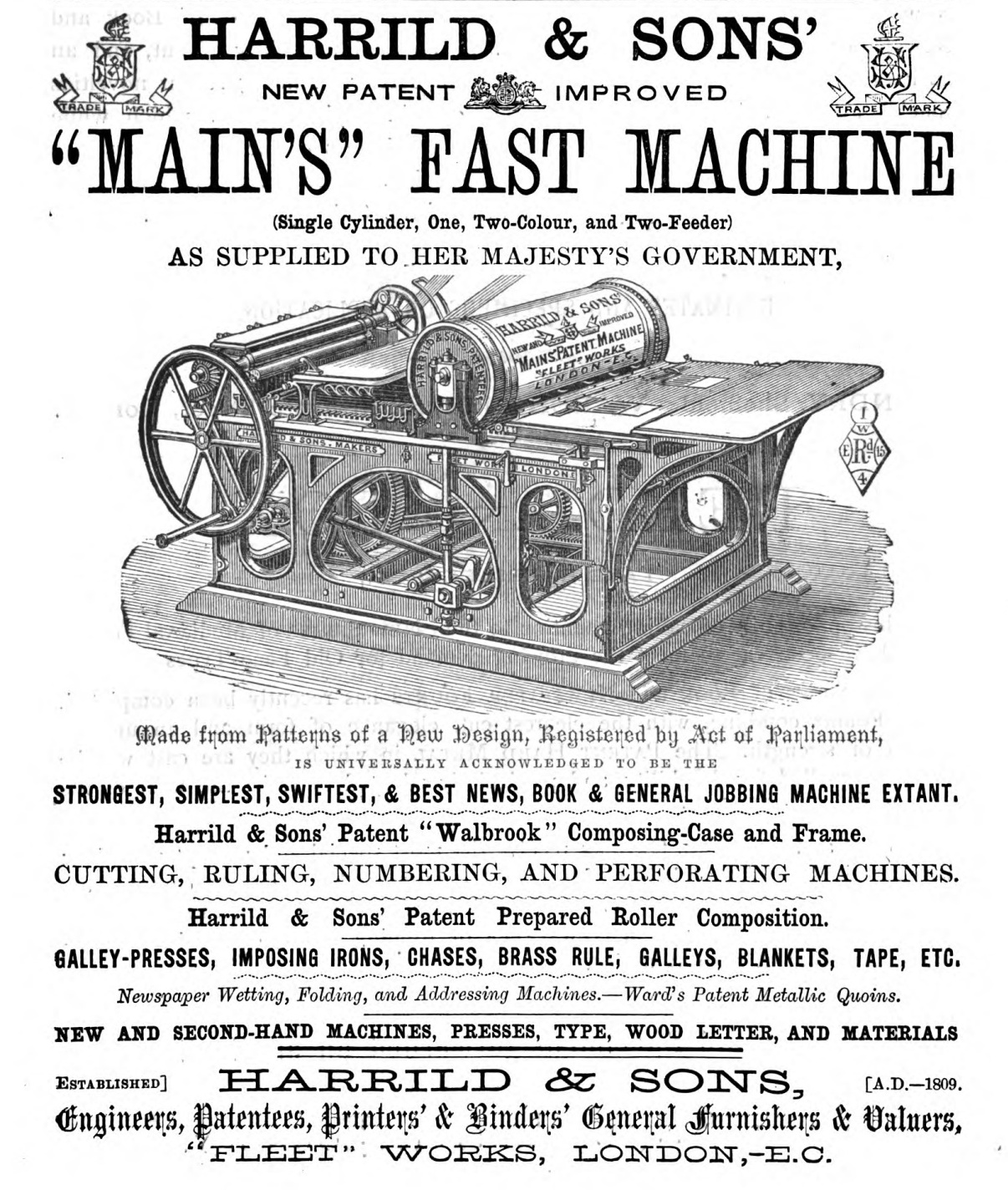
1867 advertisement for Harrild & Sons

== Legacy ==
In 1949, English author Edward George Downing Living published a book about Harrild & Sons Limited, titled The House of Harrild, 1801–1948. The book was published by Harrild & Sons Limited and ran into 69 pages.
