= Robert Harrild =

English printing pioneer (1780–1853)

- Born: 1 January 1780; Bermondsey, London, England
- Died: 28 July 1853 (aged 73); Sydenham, Kent, England,
- Years active: 1803-1853
- Spouse: Elizabeth Billing (1780–1853) (his death)

Robert Harrild (1 January 1780 – 28 July 1853) was an English printing pioneer. Harrild was the founder of the business Harrild & Sons, his history is recorded in 'The House of Harrild' by Edward Living written in 1949, which gives the complete history of the company, and also many names and dates of Harrilds.

== Early life ==
Robert Harrild, born in Bermondsey, London, England, was the second son of Robert Harrild of Surrey and his wife Sarah Johnson.

In 1801, at the age of 21, Harrild set up in partnership with Edward Billing at the Bluecoat-Boy Printing Office, Russell Street, Bermondsey. In the same year, Harrild married Edward Billing's sister, Elizabeth. Joseph Billing, son of Thomas Billing and nephew of Edward, later married Sarah Harrild, daughter of Robert. Seven of Robert and Elizabeth's ten children survived into adulthood, their daughter Mary married the colour-printing innovator George Baxter (printer), Baxter's sister Mary married Robert's eldest son and heir Robert Harrild.

== Printing career ==
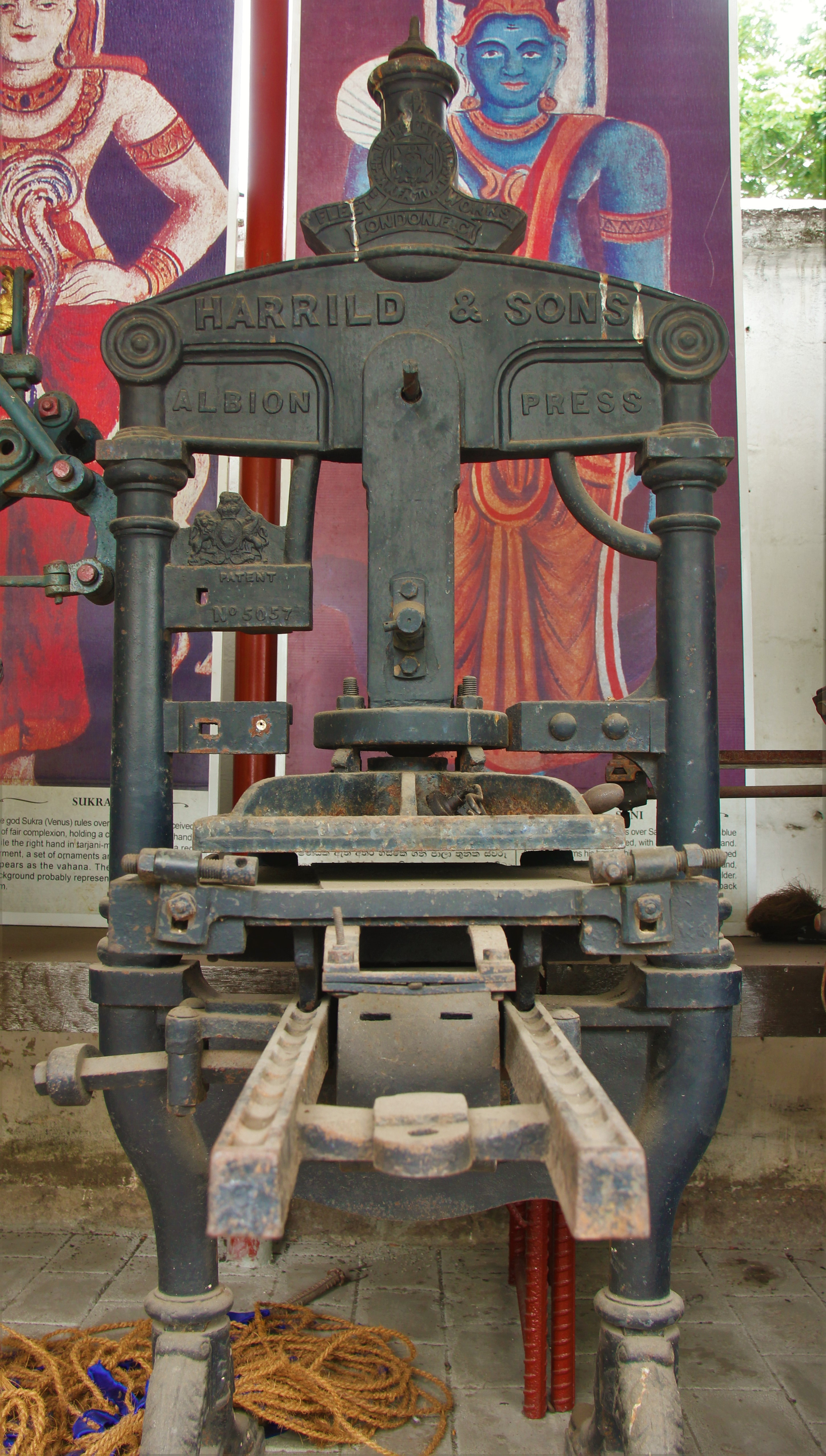
Albion press manufactured by Harrild & Sons

In 1807, Harrild branched off on his own to premises at 127 Bermondsey Street. During this period he published and printed a number of books, some copies of which are in the Bodleian Library at Oxford University.

In 1809, Harrild started up in business making printers' materials and working as a printers engineer. When he began, the blocks of type used in printing were inked by means of ink balls, a method introduced by Caxton. Harrild is noted for having improved the process by introducing ‘composition rollers’ which sped up printing and became an indispensable innovation. At first this change was met with opposition from the workforce, and Harrild had to bring all his tact and energy to the situation to persuade people that it was in their interests to work with the new rollers.

Harrild continued to make both balls and rollers for inking after 1810, but his new rollers vastly increased the production of newspapers, whereas the old ball method of inking limited printing to between 150 and 200 copies per hour. Harrild introduced the rollers for inking at his London factories in Farringdon Road; as printers and compositors from all over England visited to see the invention, his new method quickly became known and adopted throughout the industry. Harrild himself came to be considered one of the heads of the printing trade, and gained esteem in part due to his energetic character and philanthropic work.

Around 1819, Harrild moved the business to 20 Great Eastcheap, London. He specialized at this time in printing books for children.

During the years 1818–1825, the business branched into considerable amounts of commercial printing and Harrild was instrumental in manufacturing rollers for printing machines and for installing and maintaining these rollers in many of the Fleet Street newspaper offices. In 1824, Harrild moved the business again, this time to 25 Friday Street and 3 years later took over 10 and 11 Distaff Lane.

By 1832 the printing side of the business had been discontinued and he concentrated on the engineering side, manufacturing his own printing presses and supplying rollers and materials.

== Later life and family ==
Harrild was responsible for preserving the Benjamin Franklin printing press. Franklin's machine was one that he worked on as an unknown journeyman, whilst living in London in 1752–6; although it became obsolete when first the Blaew Press and later the Stanhope were invented, Harrild kept the machine on which Franklin had worked until 1841. Harrild exhibited the machine in public, sending the money raised by the exhibition to the London Printers' Pension Society. Harrild then presented the Franklin Press to Mr J. B. Murray, from America, and it was taken to the United States and put on show in the patent office at Washington, D.C. When Harrild died his will made a bequest of £1000 to the 'Printers' Society' which was to be used to create a 'Franklin Pension'.

Harrild made his home at Sydenham and for many years he was a parish guardian, having been one of the first to be appointed after the passing of the Poor Law Amendment Act 1834. When he arrived Sydenham was little more than a wild common, by the time of his death it had become a popular residential neighbourhood, in part due to his own interest in the area. Harrild had been instrumental in developing much of the new housing on Sydenham Common and he had built 'Round Hill' as the family home. His sons Horton and Thomas also had houses built there. Harrild purchased the spire removed in 1829 from St Antholin, Budge Row church in the city (where he was a churchwarden) and had it erected at Round Hill. The house was demolished in the 1960s but the spire remains.

His son Henry does not appear to have played a part in the family business, or to have lived at Sydenham, but in Islington. Harrild's will excluded all but a minor provision for Henry. His son Thomas became uncle, by marriage, to the author Richard Jefferies, whose sister Sarah married Robert Billing, son of Joseph Billing and Sarah Harrild.
