= Albion press =

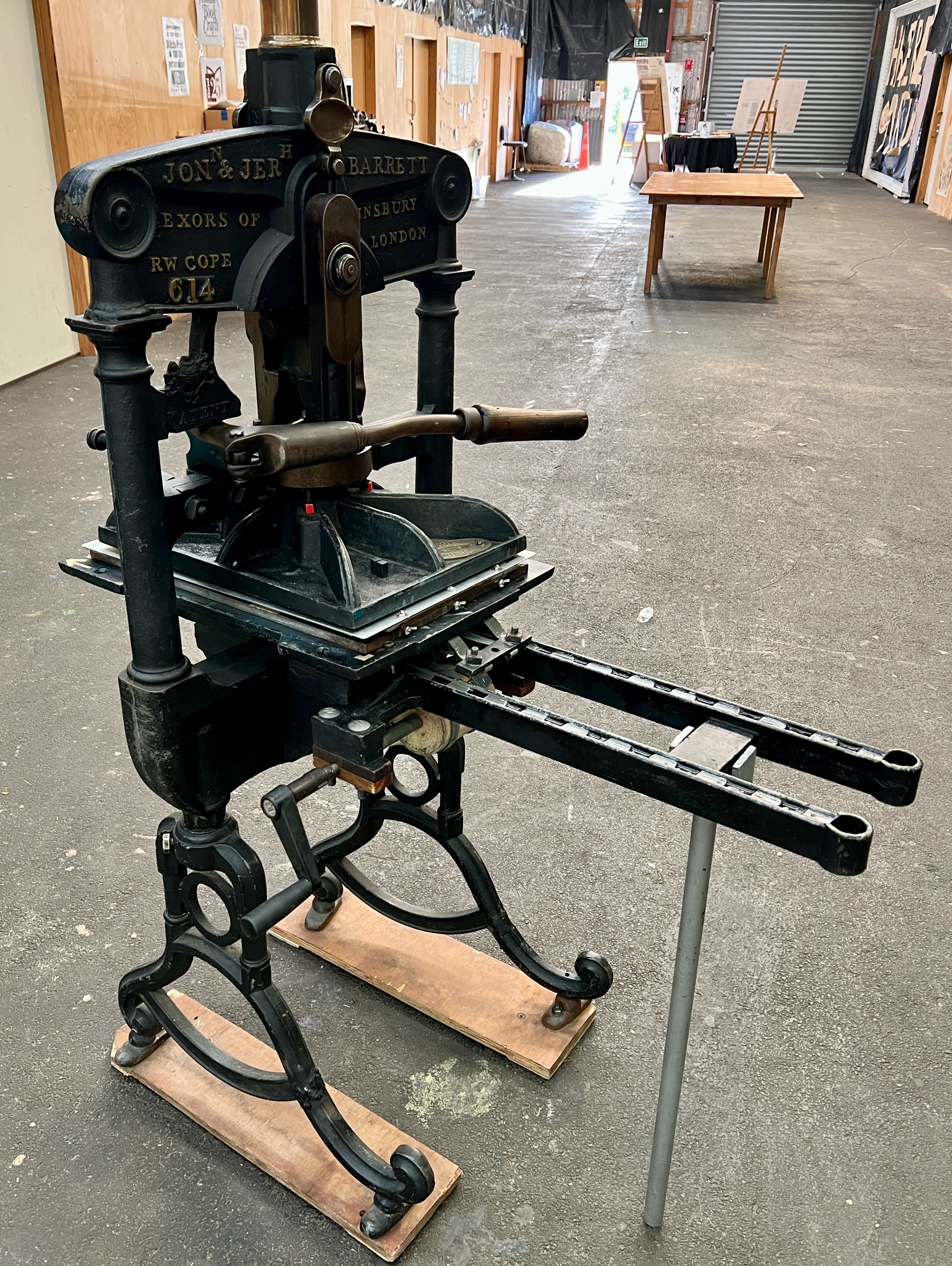
1833 Albion Press at Printopia 2025, Auckland, New Zealand

The Albion press is a model of early iron hand printing press, originally designed and manufactured in London by Richard Whittaker Cope (d. 1828?) around 1820.

== History ==
The Albion press worked by a simple toggle action, unlike the complex lever-mechanism of the Columbian press and the Stanhope press. Albions continued to be manufactured, in a range of sizes, until the 1930s. They were used for commercial book-printing until the middle of the nineteenth century, and thereafter chiefly for proofing, jobbing work and by private presses.

Francis Meynell often used an Albion to proof pages of his designs for Nonesuch Press books, and printed some small books and ephemera using the press. Printers still predominantly using an Albion Press in the United Kingdom to publish limited fine press editions include Ian Mortimer's I.M. Imprimit, and the St James Park Press of James Freemantle.

After Cope's death, Albions were manufactured by his heirs and members of the Hopkinson family (trading initially as 'Jonathan and Jeremiah Barrett' and later as 'Hopkinson and Cope'), who are said to have improved the design. From the 1850s onwards Albion presses were manufactured under licence by other firms, notably Harrild & Sons, Miller and Richard, and Frederick Ullmer Ltd. The toggle-action, and the distinctive shape and 'crown' finial of the Albion, make it instantly recognizable.

== Gallery ==
Printing with an Albion press

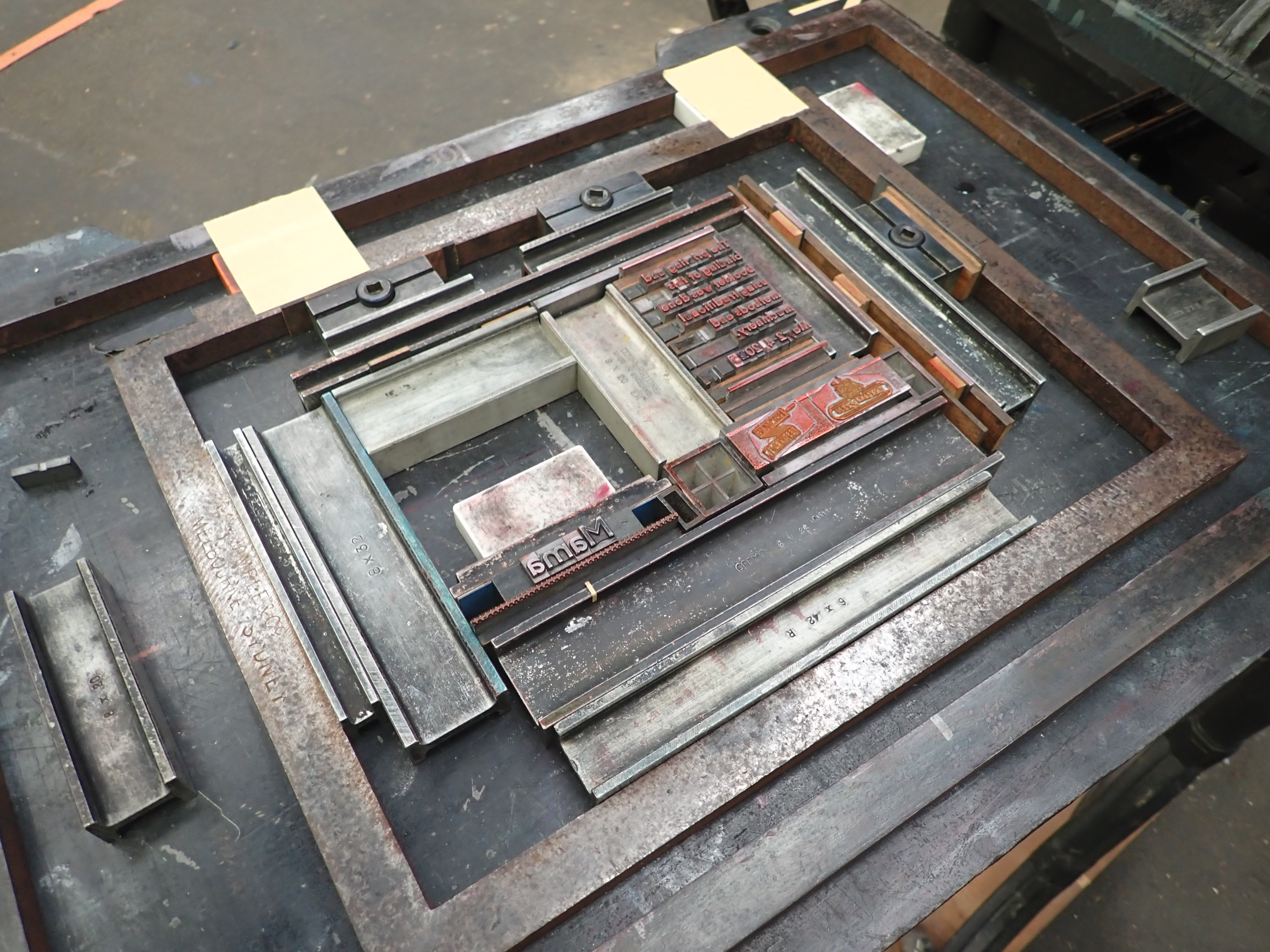
The set type prior to inking

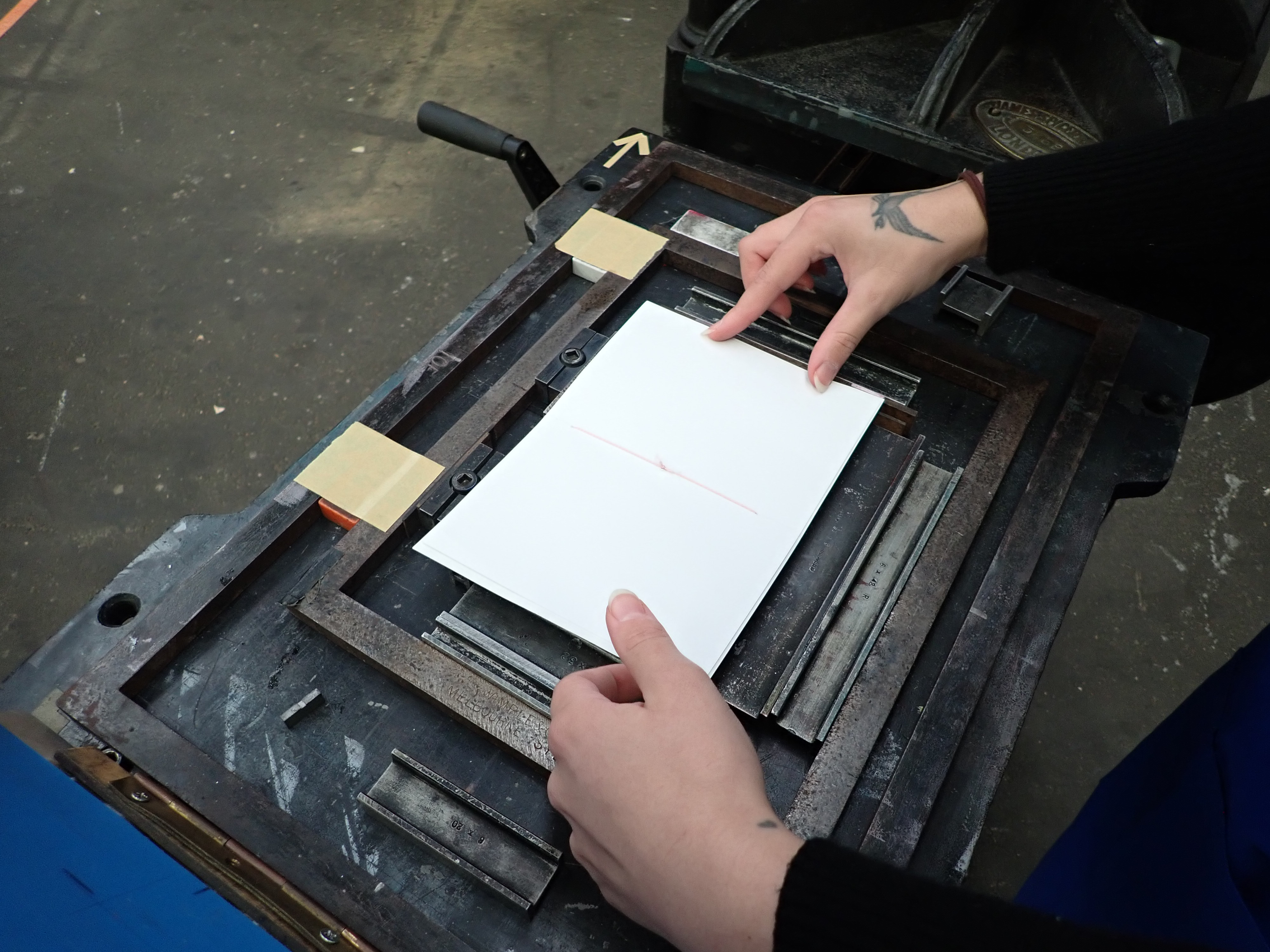
Laying a card directly onto the inked type (paper would normally be attached to the tympan by a frisket)

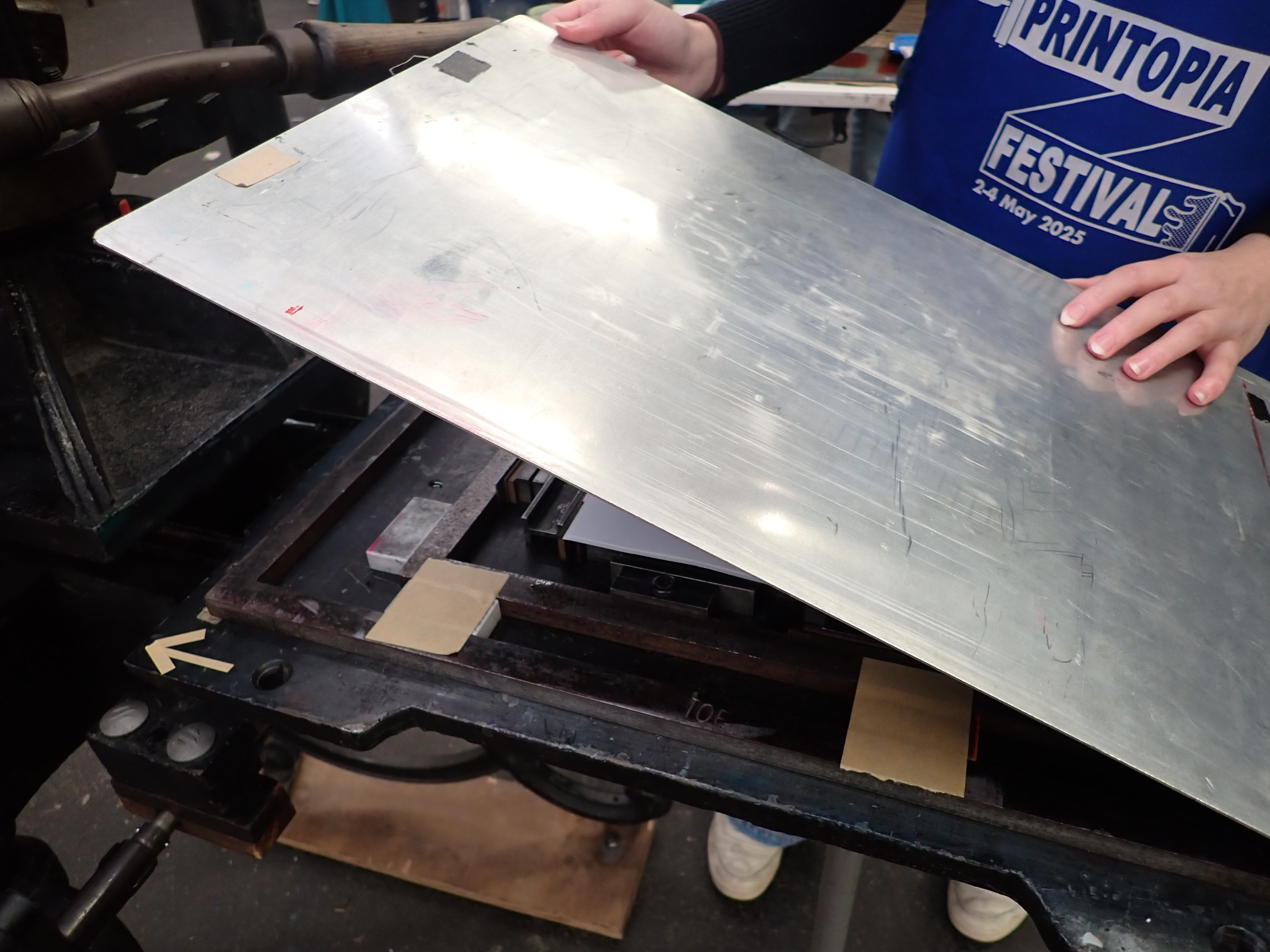
Covering the type with the hinged tympan

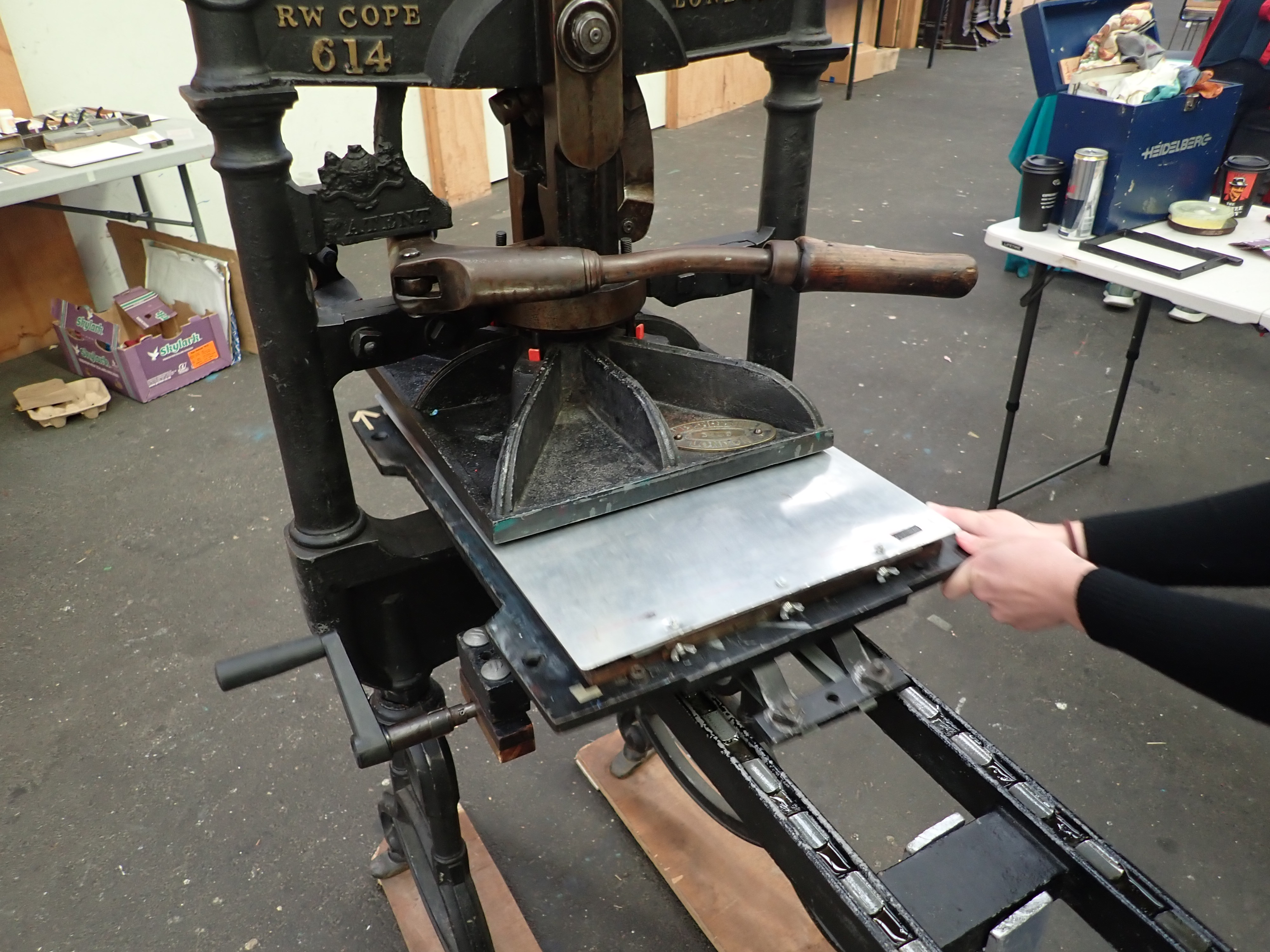
Moving the covered set type under the platen

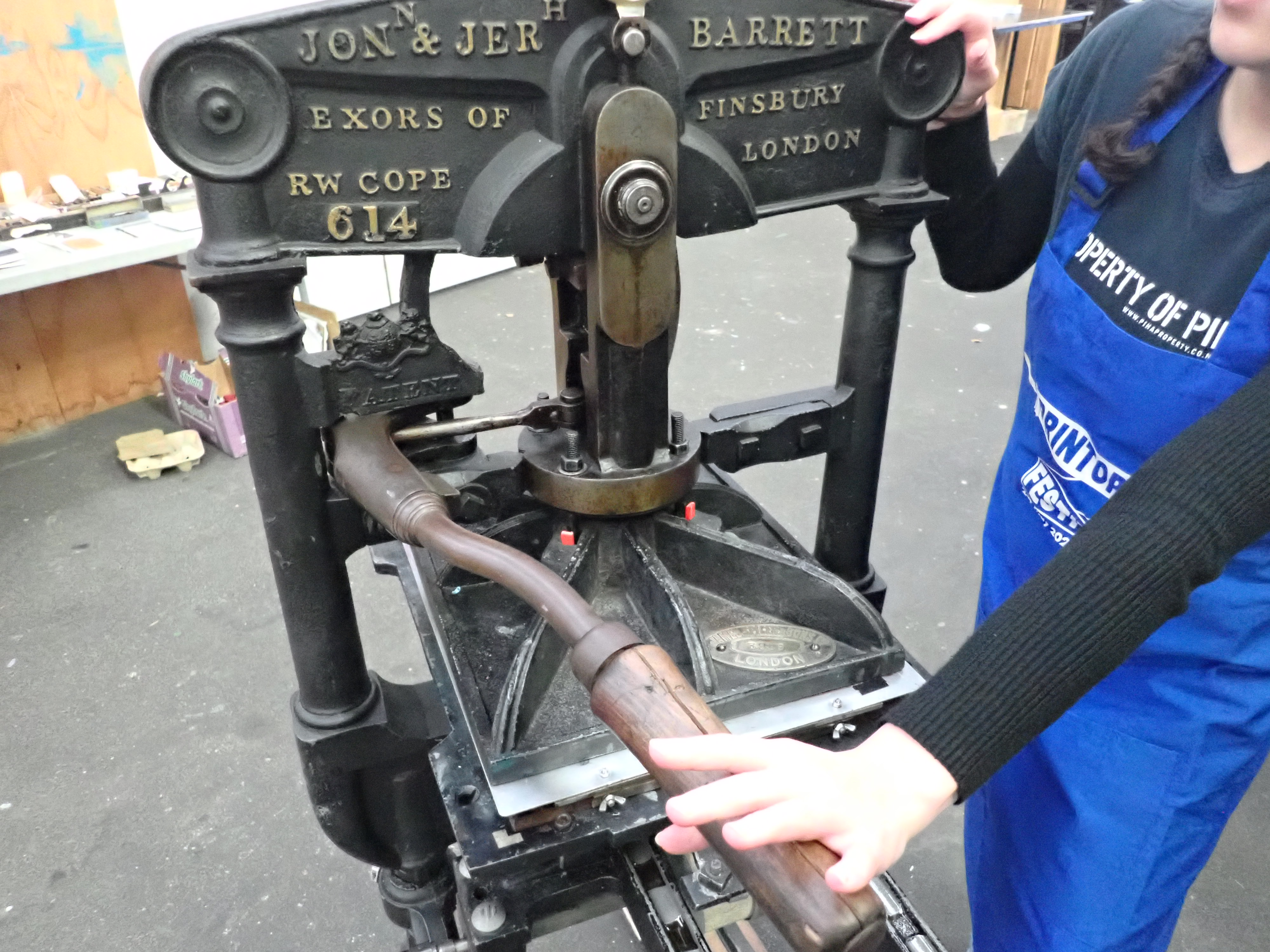
Pushing a lever to press the heavy platen against the tympan

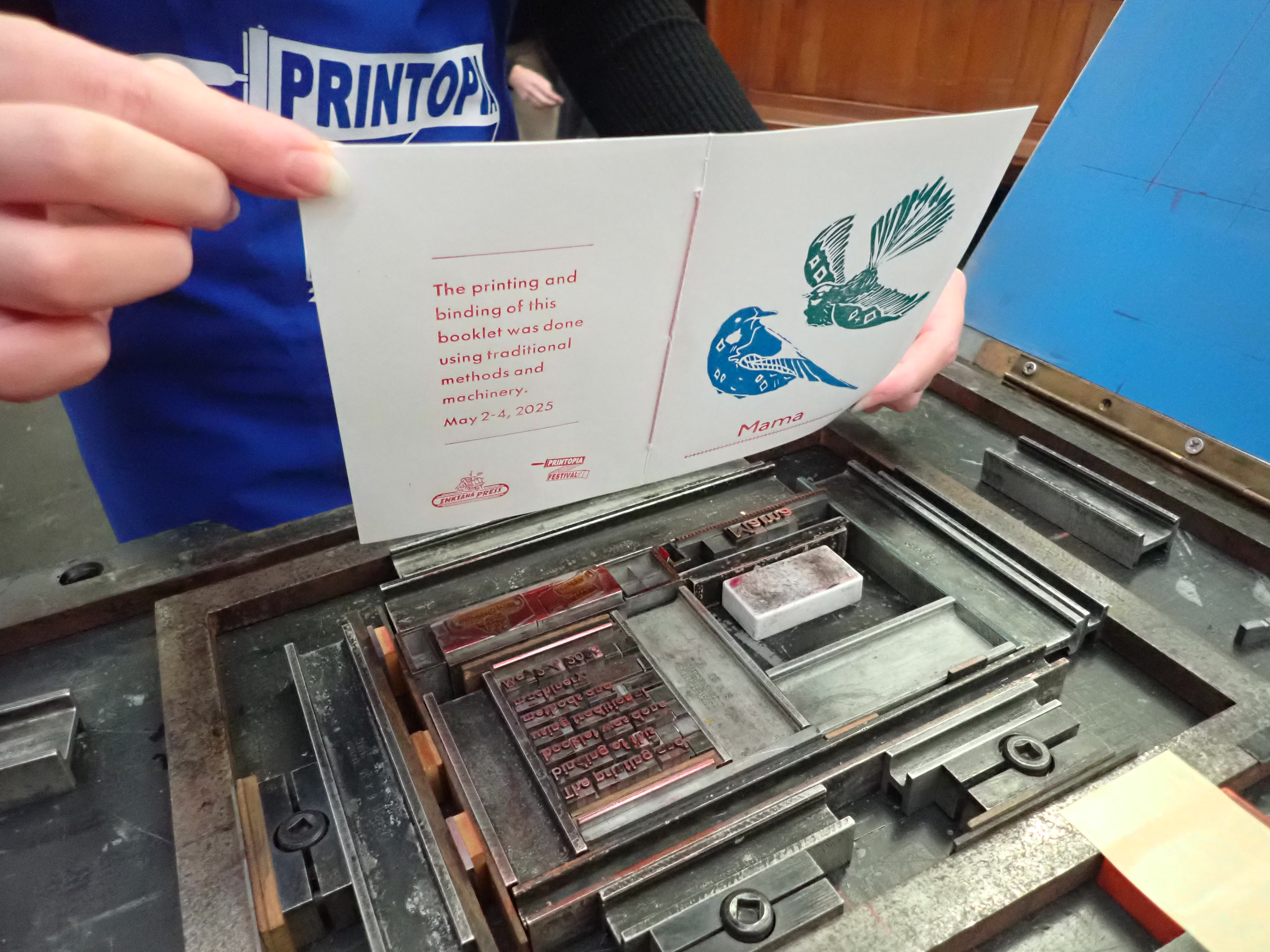
Peeling the finished card

== Glossary ==
type
movable components (usually individual alphanumeric characters or punctuation marks)
frisket
a sheet of oiled paper that covers the space between the type or illustrations and the edge of the paper that is to be printed
platen
a flat metal plate pressed against a medium (such as paper) to cause an impression
tympan
cloth or paper mounted in a frame which is placed over the sheet of paper immediately prior to lowering the platen
