= Cinematography of Royal Space Force: The Wings of Honnêamise =

Cinematography of the 1987 anime film

Gainax's 1987 debut work, the feature film Royal Space Force: The Wings of Honnêamise, was a pre-digital anime, requiring that its animation cels and background paintings be photographed onto movie film. The actual scenes in the completed work were created through this cinematographic process, involving for some shots as many as 12 different layers of cels, backgrounds, and masks designed to selectively illuminate portions of an image. Special photographic techniques were employed in multiple scenes to express particular optical or motion effects. Assistant director Shinji Higuchi, a veteran of the film crew's earlier live-action amateur works, assisted on the photography of Royal Space Force as well; Takami Akai commented that the filmmakers' live-action experience influenced their thoughts on the perspectives and compositions used in scenes, not out of an attempt to "emulate" live-action but to seek a realism in anime, a medium where "the camera doesn't really exist."

Although the film had been pitched as offering a younger person's critical perspective on anime, and its 24-year-old writer and director Hiroyuki Yamaga was seen as an example of a new creative generation, Yamaga felt it very important to note the contributions from both the older and younger generations in the industry to the making of the film. The lead cinematography staff on Royal Space Force were both 20 years older than Yamaga, industry veterans Hiroshi Isakawa and Iwao Yamaki. Isakawa described difficulties and frustration with Gainax's techniques, demands, and work schedule on the film, yet accepted it was "in pursuit of perfection," and "a work that made full use of anime's best merits," whereas Yamaki felt it was Gainax's lack of experience in the industry that opened up the prospect of a generation seeking in Royal Space Force "new adventures" in cinematographic technique that would help advance anime as a filmmaking medium.

== Cinematography ==
=== Method and live-action influence ===
As a pre-digital anime, the scenes in Royal Space Force were created by using a camera to photograph the animation cels and backgrounds onto movie film. A scene would typically consist of a series of separate individual shots known as "cuts," with each cut being prepared for the photographer by collecting into a bag all animation cels and background elements to be used in that particular cut. Akai noted that Anno's animation of the flakes of frost falling from the rocket at liftoff required so many cels (Note: In an interview shortly after the film's completion, Anno laughed that as he was given freedom to animate the launch however he wanted, he ended up making 250 drawings for one three-second sequence, layering them in as many as eight or nine levels of cels at once.) that the cuts for the scene were carried in a box, rather than a bag.

Many of the scenes in the film would be created through special photographic techniques applied to the underlying animation; an example was the appearance of the television screen in the Royal Space Force barracks. Gainax came up with the idea to take a clear acrylic panel cover from a fluorescent lamp and place it over the animation cels depicting the TV broadcast, moving the cover around as the cels were photographed; the motion of the prismatic pattern on the cover simulated the look of an image with varying reception quality. The appearance and disappearance of an analog television's cathode ray-generated images as a channel was switched or the set turned off was further simulated by using a photo compositing technique, as it was felt employing a simple camera fade would reduce the realism of the effect. The TV screen images were shot at the T Nishimura studio, a photography specialist that would later contribute to 1989's Patlabor: The Movie.

Besides the technical necessity to photograph the animation, Gainax's own prior experience in filming amateur live-action works had a broader influence on the construction of the animated scenes themselves; the sequence early in Royal Space Force where Tchallichammi and Shiro converse in the bathroom is described in the director's commentary as a "simple scene" which was nevertheless redone many times as the staff debated the relative motions and placement of the two characters "as if we were shooting this in live-action." Akai and Yamaga remarked that it had not been their intent as animators to "emulate" live-action films, but rather to make animation with a realism based on their experience of "look(ing) through the camera lens to see what it sees ... there weren't many people who could [both] draw and understand how the camera works ... It's difficult to express animated films realistically. The camera doesn't really exist." Another reflection of their live-action experience involved building scale models of Marty's motorcycle, the Honnêamise naval jet and air force prop planes, and the Royal Space Force headquarters building. These models were used as reference aids for the animators, (Note: A team of six model builders worked on the film, including Orochi Strikes Again special effects crew veteran Akinori Kishida. Anno remarked that the set of models made for the film also included the street sweeper; he described them as very useful in his animation work, noting as an example that he could not have understood the shape of the Honnêamise air force plane without first having the model as a reference, but that ironically the model was not available when it came time to actually draw the key animation, as it had gone out of the studio for use in publicity interviews.) but also to choose which angles and viewpoints to use in scenes where the modelled objects would appear; in the figurative sense, to "decide where the cameras should be."

=== Director of photography ===
The director of photography on Royal Space Force was Hiroshi Isakawa of Mushi Production, where the animation for the pilot film had been shot in early 1985. Isakawa had subsequently been asked to direct photography on the full-length film as well; in an interview after the film's completion, he remarked that he was originally assured photography could begin in April 1986, but received no cuts to film (Note: Shoichi Masuo had noted that one of his responsibilities as an assistant director on Royal Space Force was to send the genga, or key animation drawings, to various outside studios that would then complete the cuts; among the 25 such subcontractors for the film were AIC, Madhouse, Artland, Magic Bus, and Mushi Production. However, whereas ordinarily on an anime TV show or film such subcontractors would be sent batches of 50 or 100 cuts to complete, Masuo remarked that on Royal Space Force he was obliged to send batches consisting of only 10 or 20 cuts at a time, as animation work had begun with the storyboards still unfinished.) until August and September, and then "only the easy work," with Gainax putting off completing the more difficult scenes until later. (Note: Anno commented at the time that he had in fact originally planned to start with the hardest work and animate the rocket launch first; he felt, however, that it would be an impossible task before he understood the look and the worldview of Royal Space Force, and thus, Anno remarked wryly that he instead ended up animating the launch at the very last minute.) Isakawa joked that as it was not until October that the cuts began to come in at a steady pace, it was difficult for him to determine exactly how much progress they were making on the film. The most intense period of work occurred in January 1987; Isakawa completed the filming for Royal Space Force at the end of that month, noting that with the off-and-on nature of the task, the photography had taken three months of actual time.

Isakawa described the technical challenges he faced in filming Gainax's work on Royal Space Force, with some individual cuts created by using as many as 12 photographic levels consisting of cels, superimposition layers, and sheets of paper masks designed to capture isolated areas of different colored transmitted light (a photographic technique usable with translucent items such as animation cels, where the image can also be illuminated by light passing through the object, rather than only by reflected light). Some of the cel layers arrived with dust and scratches, which posed additional difficulties for Isakawa; he considered obscuring them with the popular method of employing a polarizing filter, but felt he could not use the technique, as such filters also obscured fine details in the cel art. Isakawa remarked that Gainax had however largely avoided what he described as the common errors in the anime industry of cels not being long enough for their background paintings, or having misaligned attachment points to peg bars. Another challenging aspect for Isakawa involved motion rather than light, such as conveying the heavy vibrations of Marty's motorcycle, or the air force plane cockpit; whereas ordinarily such scenes would be filmed while shaking the cels and the backgrounds as a unit, Gainax insisted that the elements be shaken separately.

=== Isakawa and Yamaki assess the project ===
Yamaga and Shinji Higuchi, who also served as assistant director of photography on the film, had Isakawa watch The Right Stuff and showed him NASA photos as a reference for the look they wished to achieve in certain shots. In an effort to convey a sense of the visual mystery of the film's world from space, Isakawa photographed the animation art through such tiny holes made in the paper masks for transmitted light that he felt the images could hardly be said to be lit at all; he was unable to judge the exact light levels needed in advance, having to make adjustments afterwards based on examining the developed film. Higuchi related that he had made the holes using an acupuncture needle he had obtained from a masseur on the film's staff. (Note: The staffer, nicknamed "Anma", received a brief cameo in the film as the launchpad crewman with his arm around Kharock as the Space Force celebrates the final assembly of the rocket. In the 2000 director's commentary, Akai and Yamaga cited Anma as an example of a collective spirit still fondly remembered among those who had worked on the film; a young licensed acupuncturist and masseur who "offered massages and acupuncture to tired animators...He told us that he couldn't help us with the production, but he helped by making the staff feel better. Everyone was so pleased that we created a character modeled after him.") Isakawa mentioned that he would get tired and angry after being asked to shoot five or six different takes of a cut, not seeing the necessity for it, but gave up resisting when he realized it was a work "in pursuit of perfection," and felt that the final achievement was "realistic without using the imagery of live action, a work that made full use of anime's best merits."

Iwao Yamaki of the studio Animation Staff Room, who had been director of photography on Harmagedon and The Dagger of Kamui, served as photography supervisor on Royal Space Force, assisting Isakawa and Yamaga with advice on specific shooting techniques; his suggestions included the fog effect in the sauna where the Republic officials discuss the Honnêamise kingdom's launch plans, achieved by photographing the cels through a pinhole screen, and creating the strata of thin clouds that Shiro's training flight flies through using a slit-scan method. Isakawa and Yamaki were both 20 years older than Yamaga; Yamaki remarked that Gainax's filmmaking without knowledge of established techniques opened the possibility of "many adventures," and whereas his generation had adventures through what they already knew, Yamaki wanted the next generation of filmmakers to have "different adventures", that necessitated taking new risks. Yamaki approvingly quoted Yamaga that the nature of Royal Space Force as a film was not defined by the fact it was an anime, but through how it used the techniques of anime to the fullest extent to ultimately achieve filmic effects beyond if it had been a live-action work, which Yamaga believed was the way for anime to prove its value as a cinematic medium.
