= MovieRide FX =

Automated special visual effects video compositing engine

- Developer: Waterston Entertainment
- Stable release: 1.3 (iOS), 1.6.1 (Android)
- Operating system: iOS, Android
- Type: Automated video compositing
- Website: www.movieridefx.com

MovieRide FX is a patented automated special visual effects video compositing engine used in the MovieRide FX mobile application for Android (requires Android 2.3 or later) and iOS (compatible with iPhone 4 and up, iPad, and iPod Touch (new generation), requires iOS 7 or later). MovieRide FX allows the user to personalize a "Hollywood-style" movie clip by inserting themself into the clip as the "actor".

== Features ==
The MovieRide FX app uses the relevant mobile device's camera to record a video of the user and insert it into a pre-packaged "Hollywood style" movie clip. The "actor" is extracted from their recorded video clip through various known effects such as masking, keying, and motion tracking. The "actor" is then inserted into one of the pre-packaged movie clips created by the MovieRide FX visual effects artists. This is done through an automated process requiring little or no artistic or technical skill from the user. The custom movie clips pre-packaged with MovieRide FX offer the user a variety of movie scenarios. Additional clips based on popular television and movie themes are continually being developed and are available on a freemium basis.

== Sharing ==
Once the user's footage has automatically been composited into a movie clip and rendered as an .mp4 file, it can be shared via social media, such as Facebook, YouTube, and Twitter, and by e-mail.

== History ==
=== 2012 ===
- MovieRide FX was created by Grant Waterston and Johann Mynhardt, who started development in 2012.

=== 2013 ===
- The beta version was released on Google Play in July 2013.
- In August 2013 MovieRide FX was a New Media Award winner in the "New Media" category of the Accolade International Awards in Los Angeles.
- In October 2013 MovieRide FX was awarded exhibitor space in the ‘start-up village’ at the Apps-World Expo in London.

=== 2014 ===
- MovieRide FX reached the 100 000 – 500 000 downloads category on the Google Play Store in June 2014.
- The official Android version was launched in July 2014.
- iOS version released in August 2014.
- MovieRide FX was selected as one of the "Top 150" startups at the Pioneer Festival in Vienna in September 2014.
- In November 2014 MovieRide FX was shortlisted for the Appster Awards in the "Best Entertainment App" and "Most Innovative App" categories and was awarded exhibitor space at the ‘start-up village’ at the Apps-World Expo in London.
- Patent applications were filed in South Africa, the EU and USA in April 2014.

=== 2015 ===
- In September 2015 MovieRide FX was shortlisted for "Best Software innovation" at The Technology Expo Awards in London.

=== 2016 ===
- In April 2016 MovieRide FX was nominated for a National Science and Technology Forum (NSTF) award for 'Research leading to Innovation by a corporate organization'
- In August 2016 Movie Ride FX won two Gold Awards at the 2016 Mobile Marketing Awards (MMA Smarties SA). These two Gold awards were for the 'Innovation' and 'Best in Show’ categories.
- In December 2016 FlicJam Inc. was formed in the US to access the larger global market.
- EU patent application was published in March 2016.

=== 2017 ===
- South African patent was granted in February 2017.

=== 2018 ===
- US patent was granted in March 2018.
