= Thomasina Scarlet =

Medical practitioner in Elizabethan London

Thomasina Scarlet practiced medicine in Elizabethan London from 1578 to 1610. Scarlet was an empiric who treated patients in her private practice. During the span of roughly 32 years in which she practiced, she was prosecuted at least five times by the College of Physicians for unlicensed practice.

== Female practitioners in Elizabethan London ==
In Elizabethan London, women had a variety of medical roles, including midwives, searchers, nurses, hospital matrons, surgeons, and empirics. Some women married male surgeons or apothecaries and established joint medical practices. Another important role women during this time had in medicine was as caregivers and nurses. It was common at this time for doctors and surgeons to treat patients who has chronic illnesses, this created a large demand for skilled, caring medical professionals to see to it that these patients in pain would be properly taken care of, a role filled almost exclusively by women. Searchers, were mostly women hired by a low tier of government known as a parish. They functioned similarly to what a coroner does today, trying to find the cause of death in a body. Hospital matrons reformed nursing departments throughout Elizabethan London, transforming being a nurse from a job of mainly widows, to a respected position desired by middle and upper-class women.

== Career and court cases ==
Throughout her years working as a medical professional, Scarlet helped many people. She worked as an empiric, a medical professional who observed patients and made a diagnosis based on the symptoms they showed. Working as an empiric, she was able to develop a few medical remedies, her most well known was a chemical ointment she produced. Her ointment was the reason she was brought to court both her second and third times, both of which resulted in guilty sentences. Scarlet clearly was not able to practice medicine in peace, although her practice had very similar procedures and functioned very similarly to men's practices at the time, she was targeted and brought into court many times due to unlicensed medical practice. Thomasina Scarlet was brought to court approximately five times that we know of, all of them resulted in a guilty sentence, many involving heavy fines, imprisonment, and even vowing to abstain from practicing medicine in the future. The majority of her court cases involved her treatment with purgatives, her clients would often make complaints to the College of Physicians claiming her treatments were ineffective, resulting in her many court cases. She was first brought before the court in 1588 due to her husband informing against her. She was accused of two crimes, giving purgatives to patients, and giving emetics and medical advice to over 100 people, she was found guilty and imprisoned. She was brought in again in 1595 accused of two more crimes, giving a purge and ointment to a man and giving antimony in white wine. She was again found guilty and sentenced to time in prison. She appeared before the court again in 1598, accused of treating an ulcerated knee with an ointment made of mercury, she was found guilty again, fined £10 and sentenced to prison again. In 1603 she was brought before the court again, she confessed to treating a patient and was fined £5 and imprisoned again. In 1610 she appeared before the court one last time and promised to abstain from practicing medicine.
