= Frisket =

Protective sheet on a printing hand press

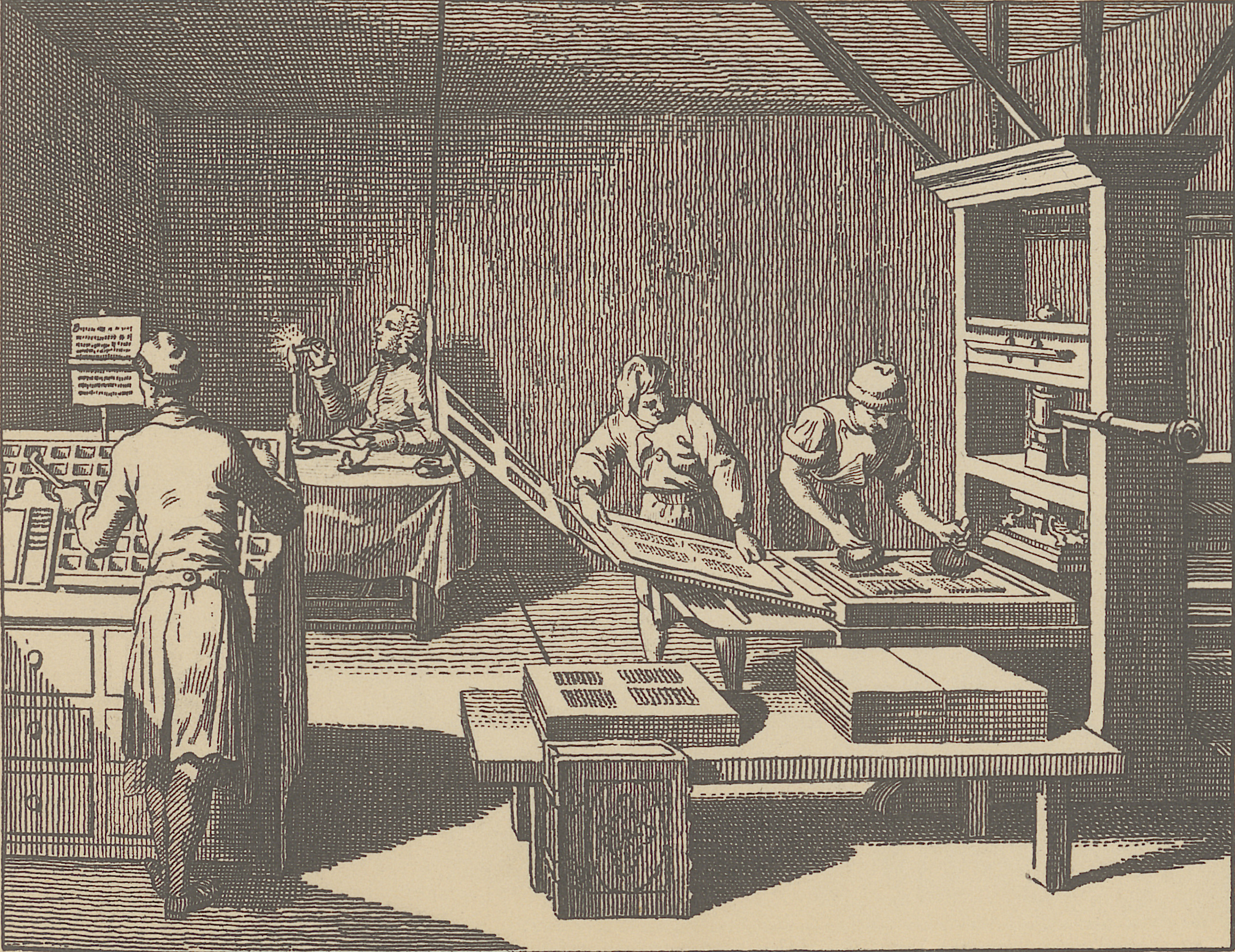
An 18th-century printing shop showing the parts of a hand press when they are opened out. The frisket is the left-most portion of the press, with four openings for the pages to be printed. The middle, with the printed sheet on it, is the tympan, and at right, the bed which holds the type being inked.

A frisket is any material that protects areas of a work from unintended change.

== Letterpress ==
On a sheet-fed letterpress printing machine, a frisket is a sheet of oiled paper that covers the space between the type or cuts (illustrations) and the edge of the paper that is to be printed. When the press operator uses a brayer to coat the surface of the type with ink, the ink brayer will often coat the furniture and slugs (wood and metal spacers) between the columns and around the type. To keep this ink from touching the target sheet, the frisket covers the area that is not desired to print. The frisket is set in a frame, often hinged to the tympan that holds the paper in place.

A new frisket has to be cut for each different page or form; a well-made frisket lasts for hundreds or thousands of impressions.

== Airbrushing ==
In airbrushing, a frisket is a plastic sheet with an adhesive backing used to mask off specific areas of an image so that only the exposed area is covered with paint. The frisket is vital to airbrushing, because it allows the artist to control excess paint spray, create special effects, achieve extreme precision, control edge attributes and expedite the airbrushing process.

A frisket differs from other masks in that it is a single sheet that covers the entire work, parts of which are removed by cutting into the sheet. Friskets are available in matté and glossy finishes. Some friskets are also solvent-proof, manufactured for use with solvent-reduced and -based urethanes.

The frisket is fixed to the painting surface and then the appropriate shapes are cut out of the material using a razor or scalpel. The cut piece is lifted, the exposed area painted, and the process repeated using the cut pieces to mask their matching finished areas. When all painting is finished, the resulting work contains precise shapes with no overspray.

== Watercolour ==
In watercolor painting, frisket, also sometimes called masking fluid, is a removable liquid masking fluid based on latex and ammonia, often available in various colours to make its presence more obvious, which is applied to the surface in order to mask off the areas that are not to be coloured by a given application of paint. Frisket is usually used when the unmasked areas are desired to be the same colour and a rapid wash is being applied, or for negative painting effects.

Watercolouring frisket is applied using a brush, allowed to dry, and then the watercolour paints are applied and also allowed to dry. Once the paper is completely dry, the frisket can be easily removed by gentle rubbing with a natural crepe rubber pickup, the same as those used for removal of rubber cement. The paper must be completely dry before removing the frisket as the friction can otherwise damage the paper if still damp.

A subsequent application of frisket can be applied to mask other areas—usually those with the intention of applying a different colour or to darken some areas whilst not affecting others—and removed with the natural rubber pickup. This process can be repeated several times without damaging artist-grade watercolour papers, so long as the paper is completely dry after each application of watercolours. Some lesser grades of paper, often used for practice and academic purposes, may be more prone to damage after repeated masking and painting cycles, however. Although watercolour frisket can be removed by rubbing with the fingers, doing so has the disadvantage of potentially transferring skin oils which can discolour the artwork, or otherwise affect subsequent applications of watercolours or other media such as chalk or ink.
