= St John the Baptist upon Walbrook =

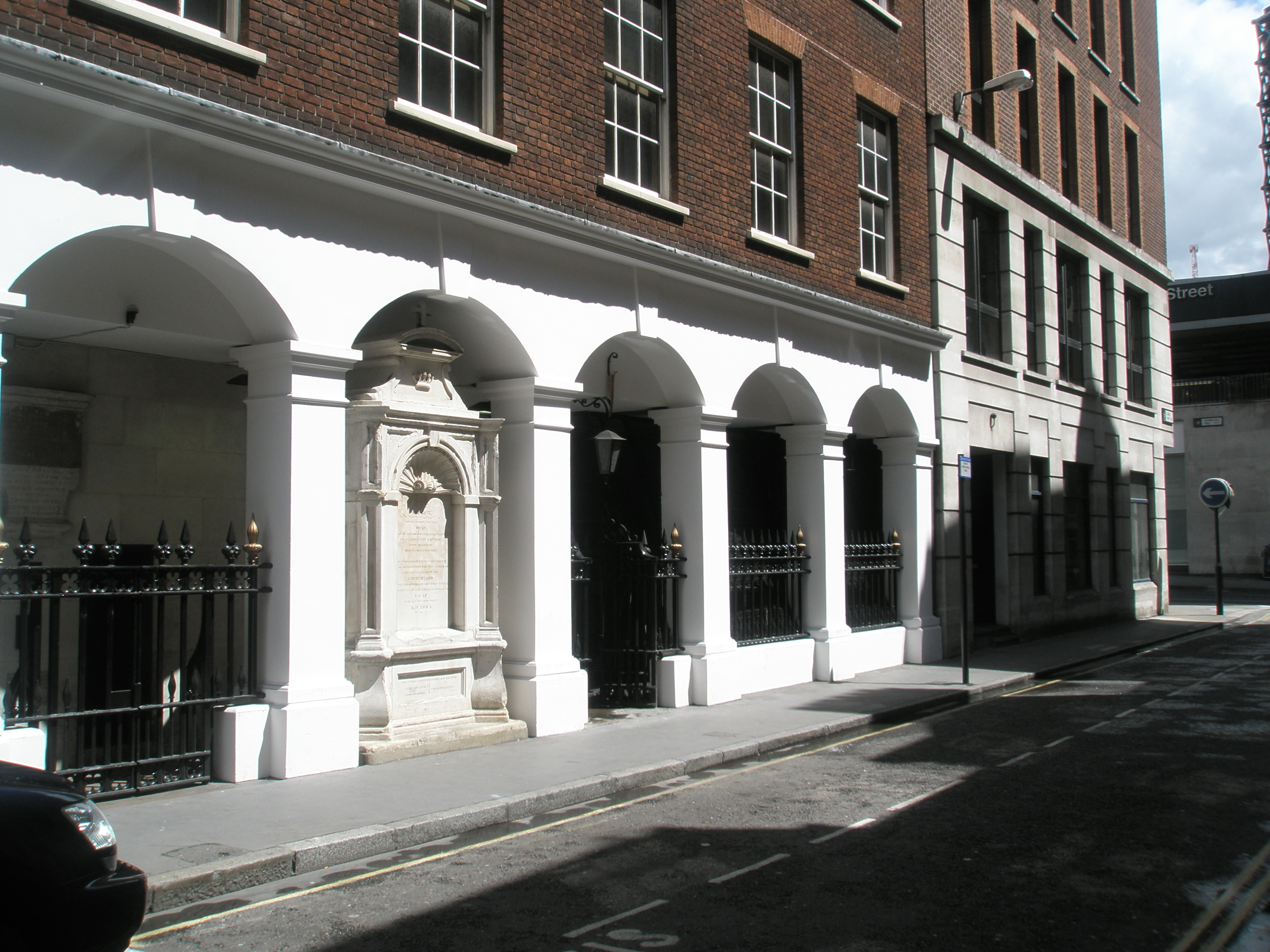
- Current photo of site
- St John the Baptist upon Walbrook
- Location: London
- Country: England
- Denomination: Anglican

Architecture
- Years built: 12th century
- Demolished: 1666

St John the Baptist upon Walbrook was a parish church in the City of London. It stood in Walbrook Ward, with parts of the parish extending into Cordwainer, Dowgate, and Vintry Wards. Of medieval origin, it was destroyed in the Great Fire of London in 1666 and not rebuilt.

== History ==
The church stood with its west end on the bank of the Walbrook, and its east end in Dowgate. It is first mentioned in the 12th Century. It was rebuilt and enlarged in 1412 and "re-edify'd and adorn'd" in 1621.

== Destruction ==
Along with the majority of 97 parish churches in the City of London, St John the Baptist upon Walbrook was destroyed by the Great Fire in September 1666. In 1670 a Rebuilding Act was passed and a committee set up under Sir Christopher Wren to decide which would be rebuilt. St John the Baptist was not one of the 51 chosen; instead the parish was united to that of St Antholin, Budge Row, and the site retained as a graveyard.

The Parish Registers of St John's were published along with those of St Antholin's by the Harleian Society in 1883.
