= St Antholin, Budge Row =

Former church-site in London

Coordinates: 51°30′45″N 0°05′31″W

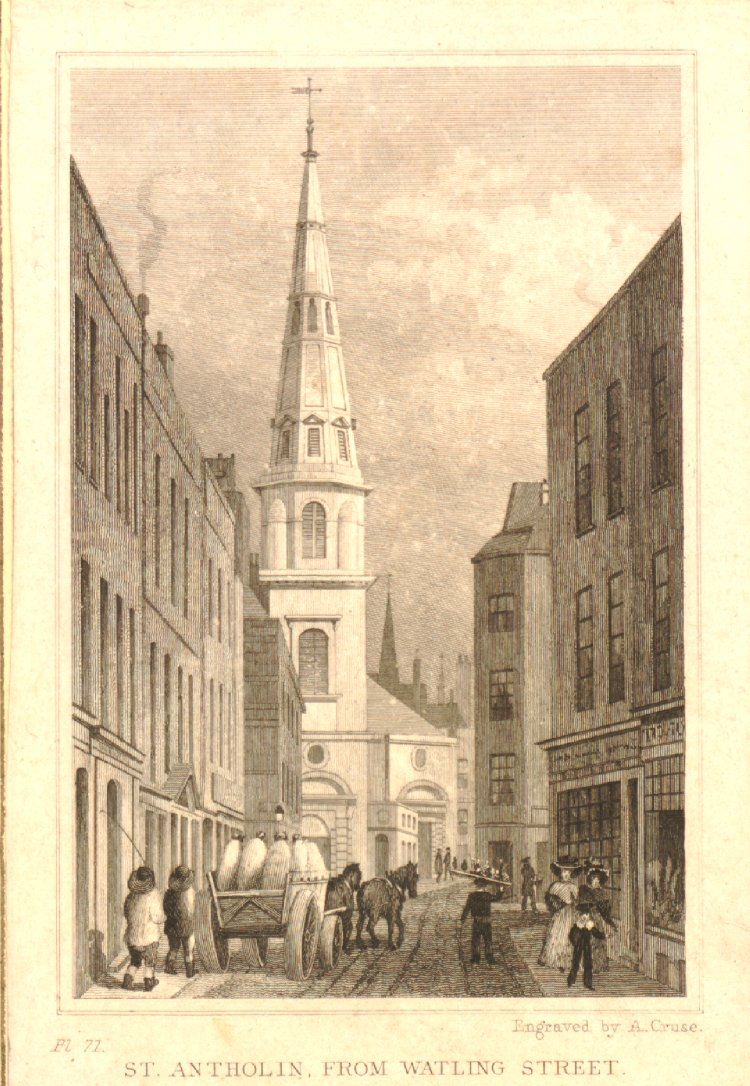
- St Antholin's, as rebuilt in the 17th century, Engraving c. 1830 by A. Cruse after Thomas Hosmer Shepherd.
- St Antholin, Budge Row
- Location: London
- Country: England
- Denomination: Anglican

Architecture
- Demolished: 1874

St Antholin, Budge Row, or St Antholin, Watling Street, was a church in the City of London. Of medieval origin, it was rebuilt to the designs of Sir Christopher Wren, following its destruction in the Great Fire of London in 1666. The 17th-century building was demolished in 1874.

== The medieval church ==
The church, which is first recorded in 1119, was on the north side of Budge Row (which no longer exists), at the corner of Sise Lane in Cordwainer Ward. It was originally known as St Anthony's, or St Anthonine's. It was dedicated to Saint Anthony the Great.

The church was "re-edified" at the expense of Sir Thomas Knollys (Mayor of London in 1399 and 1410) and his son, also called Thomas. Both were buried in the church. It seems to have been rebuilt again in 1513 by John Tate. It was repaired in 1616, at a cost of more than £900, and in 1623 a richly decorated gallery was added, its front divided into 52 panels, each bearing a coat of arms.

The church became noted for its early morning lectures, established in 1559, to announce which the bells would start to ring at 5 am.

== Rebuilding ==
St Antholin's was destroyed in the Great Fire of London in 1666, and rebuilt in 1678-84 by Sir Christopher Wren, at a cost of £5,685, paid for from the coal tax, and from contributions. The parish was united with that of St John the Baptist upon Walbrook, which was not rebuilt.

The new church was 66 feet (20 m) long and 44 feet (13 m) wide; the tower, to the top of its spire, was 154 feet (47 m) high. The exterior of the body of the church was plain in style, but the attached steeple was more unusual and elaborate: George Godwin, writing in the early 19th century said the tower and spire "although they might not be termed beautiful or pure, display great powers of invention, and are of pleasing proportions". The stone spire was octagonal in plan, divided into storeys by horizontal ribs, with circular ribs at the corners. There were openings at the base of the spire, and it was crowned with the head of a classical column of the Composite order.

The ceiling of the new church was in the form of an oval dome, supported on eight columns standing on high plinths. Godwin noted that "the carpentry of the roof displays Wren's knowledge of constructive science, and may be studied with advantage." There was a small gallery with an organ at the west end, and a circular window at the east end, above the altar.

== Nineteenth century ==
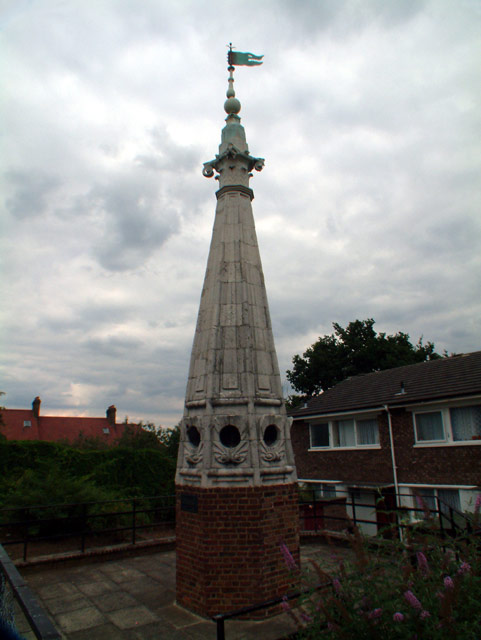
St Antholin's spire in Sydenham

In 1829, the upper part of the spire was replaced and the portion removed, with its dragon's head weathervane, was sold for £5 to Robert Harrild, a printer, who had it erected on his property, Round Hill House in Sydenham, now London SE26. It remains there today, now surrounded by modern houses, and is Grade II listed.

The church was demolished in 1875 under the Union of Benefices Act to make way for the development of Queen Victoria Street. At this time many bodies were disinterred from the crypt and reburied at Brookwood Cemetery and the City of London Cemetery. The parish was then joined to that of St Mary Aldermary.

== St Antholin's, Nunhead ==
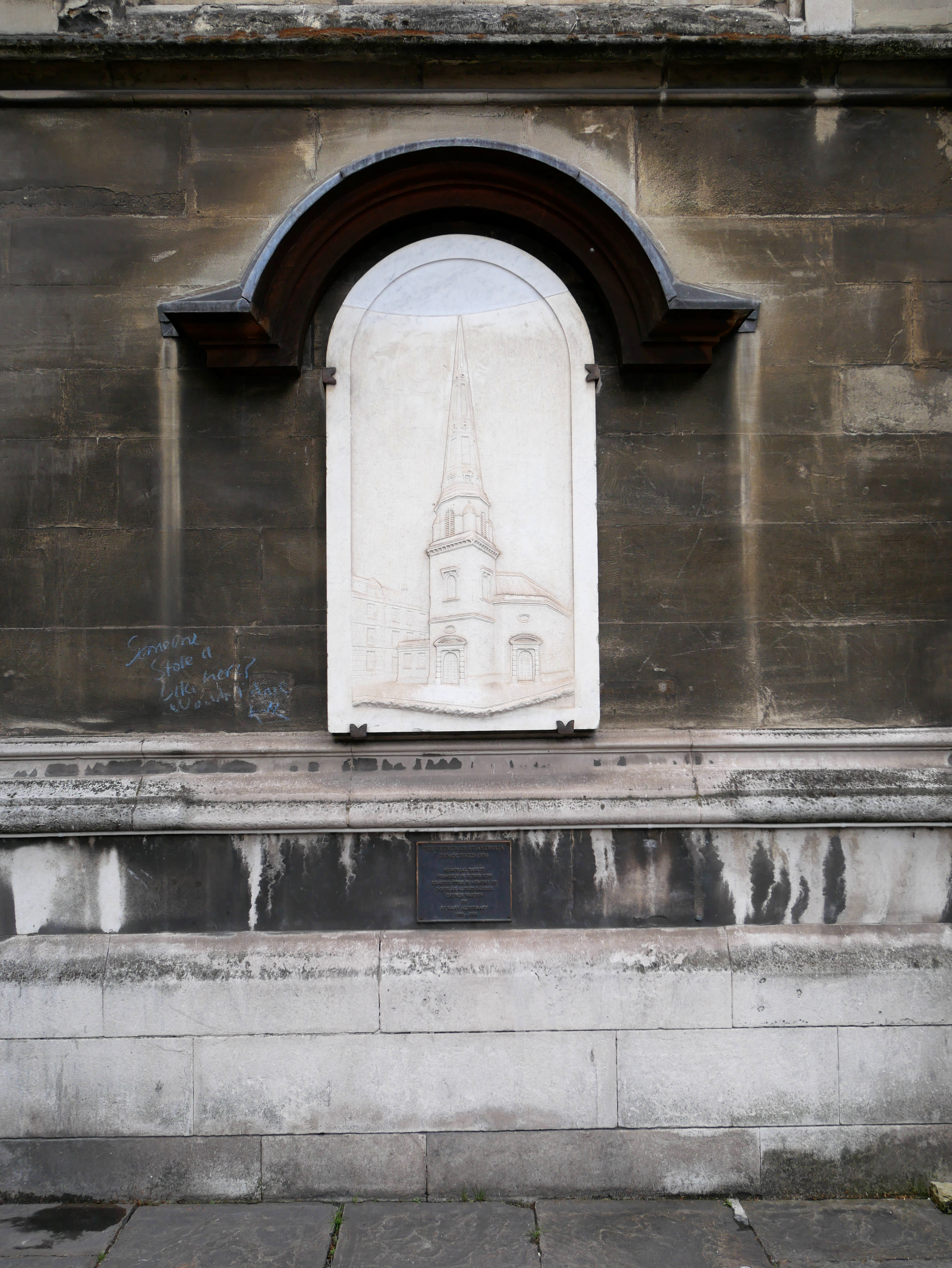
A memorial to the lost Church of Saint Antholin on the south wall of St Mary Aldermary in the City of London

The proceeds from the sale of the site came to £44,990. Some of this went towards the building of the new church of St Antholin at the junction of Nunhead Lane and Carden Road in Nunhead, in Peckham, south London, to a design by Ewan Christian. The new building also received the City church's reredos. It was consecrated on 11 May 1878. It was gutted by incendiary bombs on 27 December 1940, but was rebuilt after the war, and reconsecrated on 12 October 1957, as St Anthony, Nunhead.

In 1990 the parish was combined with that of St Silas, Peckham Rye. St Antholin's was declared redundant in 2001 and sold to a Pentecostal congregation. In 2003 St Silas was demolished and rebuilt on the same site, with the dedication of St Antony and St Silas. Two bells, one made for the City church of St Antholin in 1717, and one recast in 1925 from the metal of another, were hung in the new tower.

== See also ==
- List of Christopher Wren churches in London
- List of churches rebuilt after the Great Fire but since demolished
- Notable women
