= Searcher of the dead =

Occupation in early modern England

Searchers of the dead, also known as plague-searchers or simply searchers, were people, mostly women, hired by parishes in London, England, to examine corpses and determine the cause of people's deaths. Their written documents containing statistical data linking sickness to fatality were then turned in to parish officials for use in publishing official bills of mortality. These mortality reports have enabled historians and researchers alike to estimate the living conditions and influence of grave diseases like the bubonic plague on the given population. Searchers existed primarily in London, where they were first appointed during the plague outbreaks around 1568. They continued work through the early modern period up until the Births and Deaths Registration Act 1836, which called for all births, deaths, and marriages in England to be well-documented. They served as important figures to the parish although they were often neglected in records as many people began to question their credibility later on during the 17th century.

== During plague outbreaks ==
At the time of the Great Plague of London, most of those who could afford to leave the city did so. In general, poor, older women who did not care for the sick in other capacities such as midwifery were assigned to the task of "searching". Searchers were sometimes coerced or bribed to mask patients' causes of death. Pressure from family members and others in the household would ask that the deaths of those affected would be attributed to alternative, less severe diseases than the plague in order to avoid the inconvenience of quarantine put on houses of those who had passed from the deadly disease. These searchers at first were hired to just check on their neighbors; later they became the sole authority responsible for quantifying the effect of the plague on their community. In spite of a culture that assumed the credibility of older women to be questionable, the role was specifically given to older women, mostly widows, who lived on pension. The searchers were known as "keepers of the dead" as well, and "searchers" and "keepers" were interchangeable in this time period. The searchers were in charge of providing the information to the "bills of mortality", passed through the city bureaucracy largely via word of mouth: the searchers would report to the Constable, who would relay the information to the Alderman and parish clerk, who would pass it along to the Clerk of the parish clerks, who would record the data in official documents. From 1527-1858, this method was used to record weekly (later annual) statistics regarding deaths in London.

== Practices ==
Searchers were not trained for their jobs most times, and their duties posed serious personal health risks to those involved due to the frequent possibility of encountering forms of contagion. Their responsibilities were later divided from one of identifying plague victims into three essential purposes - searchers who determined if a sickness was associated with the plague, those who cared for the sick, and those who viewed corpses to attempt linking death to specific diseases. Searchers were required to live outside of common areas, to practice indoors, and to hold white sticks indicating their dangerous professions when they were in public spaces. The searchers had to be careful to distinguish plague from other illnesses. Their word would be the determining factor in whether the household was required to quarantine (for 28-40 days). A searcher who diagnosed incorrectly could be subject to corporal punishment, physical isolation, and economic coercion. While some continued working for up to a decade, most searchers died from the communicable diseases which they diagnosed in others.

== Wages ==
Wages for searchers were typically earned per body, indicating that the women in this profession received a greater income during seasons of major epidemics than slower times. An average pay rate during the Elizabethan period was around 2d. to 4d. per body, but different parishes offered varied amounts depending on the women and their qualifications. Additionally, these women were not allowed to take on additional jobs and ultimately had to live off of what they were provided given the circumstances. However, searchers who had worked for a long time period and had gained the respect of their parish, like Goody Richardson and others, could be allotted a substantial raise for their services.

== Notable women ==
Some examples of recognized searchers include Goodwife Pattson, who worked for St. Antholin, Budge Row, from 1590–91 to 1597–98. She worked alongside others like Mother Bamford, Goodwife Tailor, Goodwife Atkinson, and Goodwife Hubble. Widow Hubble, who was also a midwife, of St. Antholin Budge Row, was especially regarded by the parish and ultimately established a rental agreement for a house that was owned by the church. Not all searchers were as fortunate, however. Critics like John Graunt existed who were convinced that these women released unreliable and dishonest records. Despite normal criticism, searchers were instrumental in discovering symptoms associated with plague and helped to identify those affected.
