= Paper-ruling machine =

Music paper creation device

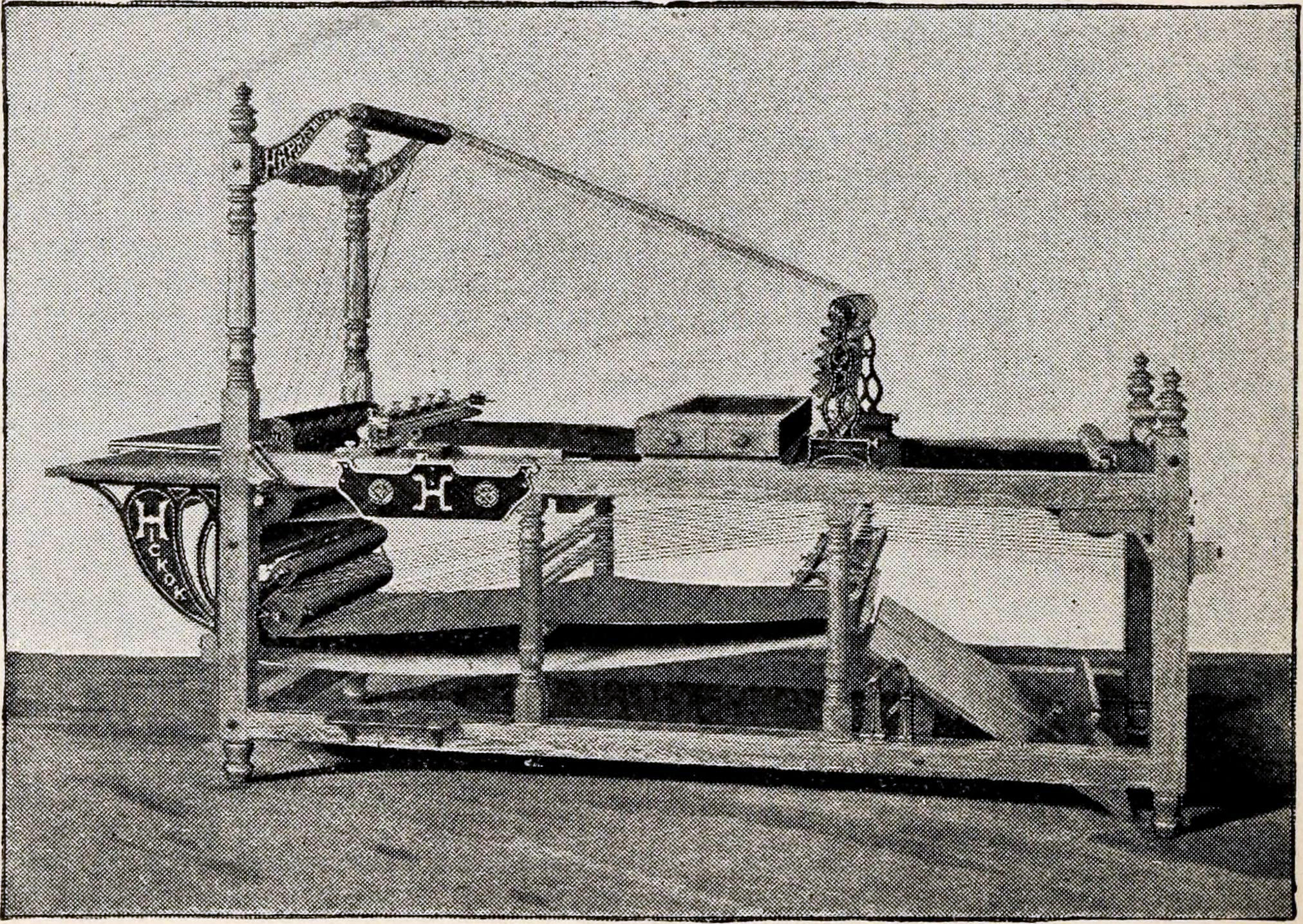
Hickok paper-ruling machine.

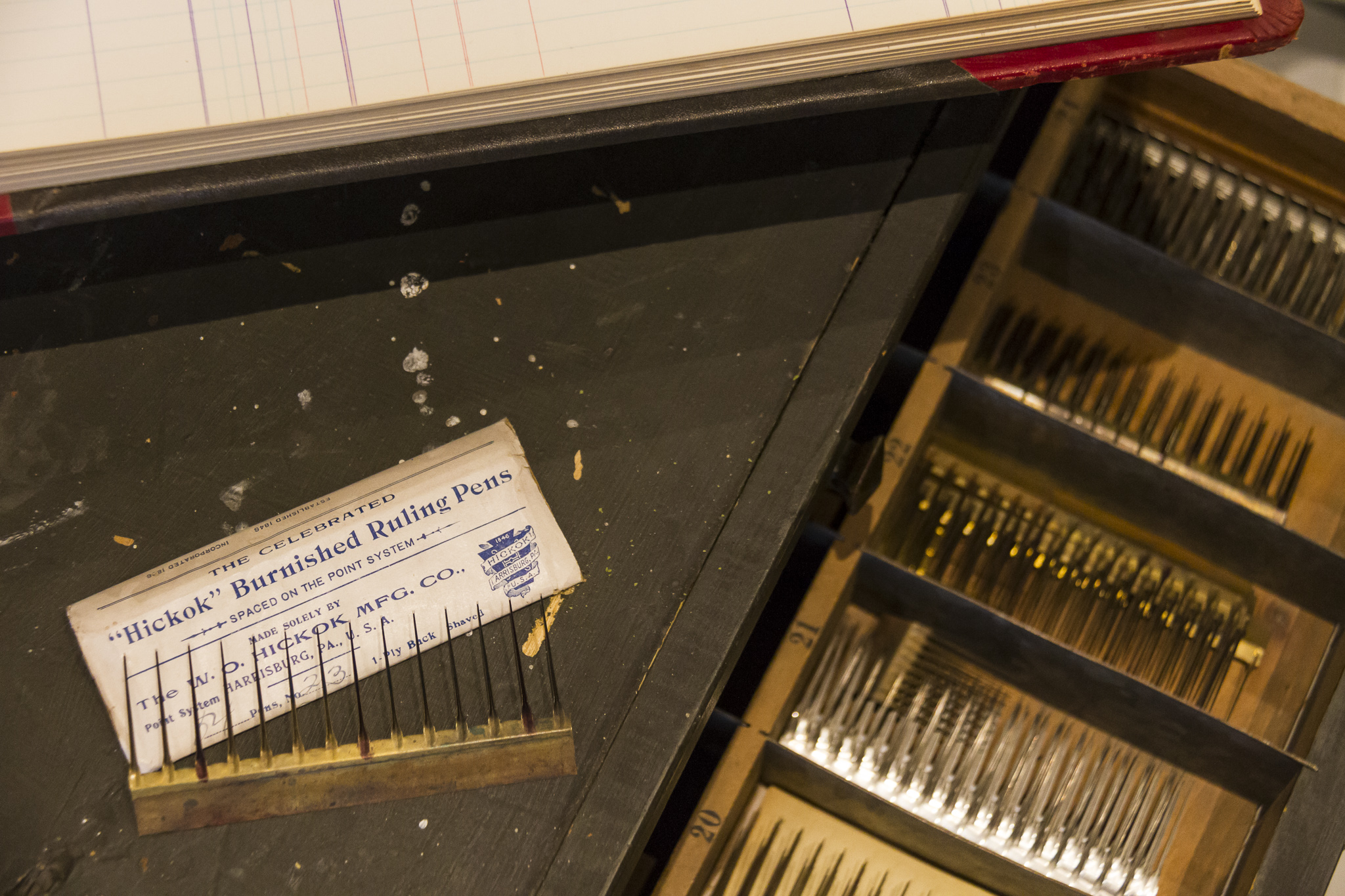
Hickok ruling pens in The American Bookbinders Museum.

A paper-ruling machine is a device for ruling paper. In 1770, John Tetlow was awarded a patent for a "machine for ruling paper for music and other purposes." William Orville Hickok invented an "improved ruling machine" in the mid-19th century. As the device is designed for drawing lines on paper, it can produce tables and ruled paper.

The functionality of the machine is based on pens manufactured especially for the device. The pens have multiple tips side by side, and water-based ink is led into them along threads. It is possible to program stop-lines on the equipment by mounting pens on shafts equipped with cams that lower and raise them at predetermined points.

The spread of computerized accounting between the 1960s and 1980s significantly decreased the demand for accounting tables and ruled paper. Nowadays, their demand is primarily filled by using offset printing.
