= Masking (art) =

Protecting a selected area from change during production

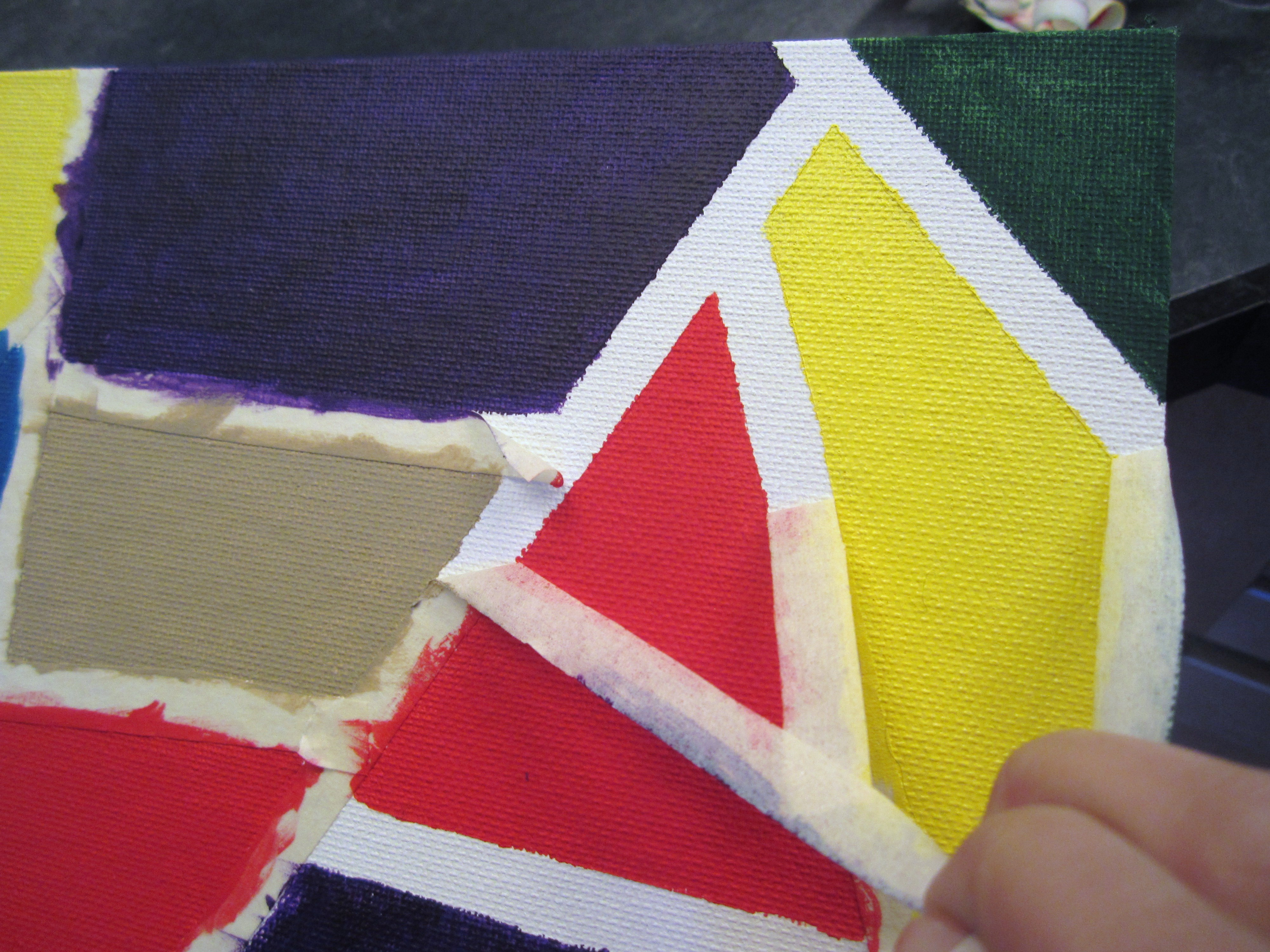
Masking tape being peeled off of a canvas, to reveal the protected, unpainted area below

In art, craft, and engineering, masking is the use of materials to protect areas from change, or to focus change on other areas. This can describe either the techniques and materials used to control the development of a work of art by protecting a desired area from change; or a phenomenon that (either intentionally or unintentionally) causes a sensation to be concealed from conscious attention.

The term is derived from the word mask, in the sense that it hides the face from view.

== In painting ==
Masking materials supplement a painter's dexterity and choice of applicator to control where paint is laid. Examples include the use of a stencil or masking tape to protect areas which are not to be painted.

=== Solid masks ===
Most solid masks require an adhesive to hold the mask in place while work is performed. Some, such as masking tape and frisket, come with adhesive pre-applied. Solid masks are readily available in bulk, and are used in large painting jobs.

- Paper products
  - Kraft paper
  - Butcher paper
  - Masking tape
- Plastic film
  - Frisket
  - Polyester tape
- Stencils
  - Silk screen

=== Liquid masks ===
Liquid masks are preferred where precision is needed; they prevent paint from seeping underneath, resulting in clean edges. Care must be taken to remove them without damaging the work underneath.

- Latex or other polymers
- Molten wax
- Gesso, typically a substrate for painting, but can also be applied to achieve masking effects

== In photography ==
Masks used for photography are used to enhance the quality of an image.

Representations of a scene—whether film, video display, or printed—do not have the dynamic contrast range available to the human eye looking directly at the same scene. Adjusting the contrast in an image helps restore some of the perceived qualities of the original scene. These adjustments are typically performed on "blown-out" highlights, and "crushed" or "muddy" shadow areas, where clipping has occurred; or on desaturated colors. Photographic masks are peculiar in that they are produced from the image they will alter, an exercise in recursion.

Masks used to produce other effects are similar to those used in painting.

=== Controlling exposure ===
==== Film ====
The basic methods of controlling exposure are dodging and burning, which respectively lighten (reduce exposure) and darken (increase exposure) areas of an image. The tools a film photographer uses range from shaped pieces of black material (such as studio foil, foam, and paper) to the photographer's hands.

To create a photographic mask, a sheet of negative film is contact-exposed to the original film negative or slide positive in a particular way. Both films are then combined to produce a processed positive. The process is similar when applied using digital techniques: the inverse of the working image is reduced to an image mask; filters or other adjustments are then applied, using the mask to selectively block portions of the image.

==== Digital ====
Image editors offer at the very least a "Select All" command and a rectangular "marquee" selection tool. (The word "marquee" describes the "crawling ants" border used to highlight the active region.) Once a selection is created, further changes to the image will be confined to that area. To continue editing the rest of the image, the selection is either "deselected" or the entire image is selected. Advanced suites offer more ways to select portions of an image, as well as ways to combine these selections.

Selection masks can be switched between an editable greyscale image and a mask. They allow the user to create a mask using the suite's painting tools.

=== Contrast masking ===
When the contrast range of an image needs to be adjusted, a contrast mask is a simple solution. The processed image resembles what would be achieved when exposing through a neutral density filter, but the effects are focused highly upon the extreme regions of the image. The blocking areas of the mask coincide with the highlights of the image, and the permissive areas with the shadows, resulting in more detail appearing in each.

==== Film ====
The mask is often made from high-quality black-and-white film, such as Kodak Technical Pan, which allows for a degree of softening on the mask. Its processing time is reduced so as to not completely oppose the original negative. Both negatives are combined and registered, and collectively exposed with additional time to compensate for the presence of the mask.

==== Digital ====
Contrast masking is made simpler with digital editing. A grayscale version of the image is produced, either by desaturation or by calculating selected ratios of the image's color channels, inverted, and blurred. The mask and original image are blended together to produce the final processed image. Some image editors allow for refinement of the effect by changing the strength of the blend.

Contrast masking can be considered to be the opposite of gamma correction, which adjusts the midtones of an image. Effects similar to contrast masking can be achieved by adjusting the response curves of an image.

=== Unsharp masking ===
A derivative of contrast masking is unsharp masking, an unusual term for a process intended to increase the apparent sharpness (acutance) of an image. Unsharp masking uses a blurred form of the image to increase contrast along regions of moderate contrast difference. Around edges, the blur region causes highlights to overexpose and shadows to underexpose. Taken to an extreme, the edges become overly visible and detract from the quality of the image—this is referred to as halation.

Unsharp masking does not increase the actual sharpness, as it cannot recover details lost to blurring.

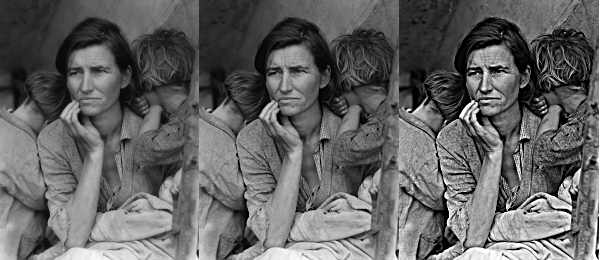
Unprocessed, slight unsharp masking, then strong unsharp masking.

==== Film ====
Unsharp masking allows the photographer to sharpen areas that have become blurred in the original negative, due to long shutter speed/exposure time, or from using a wide aperture/"fast" lens.

When creating the unsharp mask, extra space or diffusing material is added between the image and the mask to produce the necessary blur.

==== Digital ====
Unsharp masking has become automated in digital editing, with higher-end suites offering the process as a "tool" or "filter" in their standard sharpening kits—the actual creation of a mask is bypassed in favor of calculations that represent the mask's effect. The process depends on three factors: the radius of the blur, the strength of the effect, and the threshold degree of contrast above which the effect will be applied. (Adjusting the threshold allows the editor to apply the effect selectively upon moderately defined edges and ignore image noise.)

Unsharp masking is computationally more complex than other sharpening algorithms, but results in a higher-quality remedy. Deconvolution allows for truer sharpening, but is much more complex than unsharp masking.
