= Brayer =

Hand-tool historically used in printing

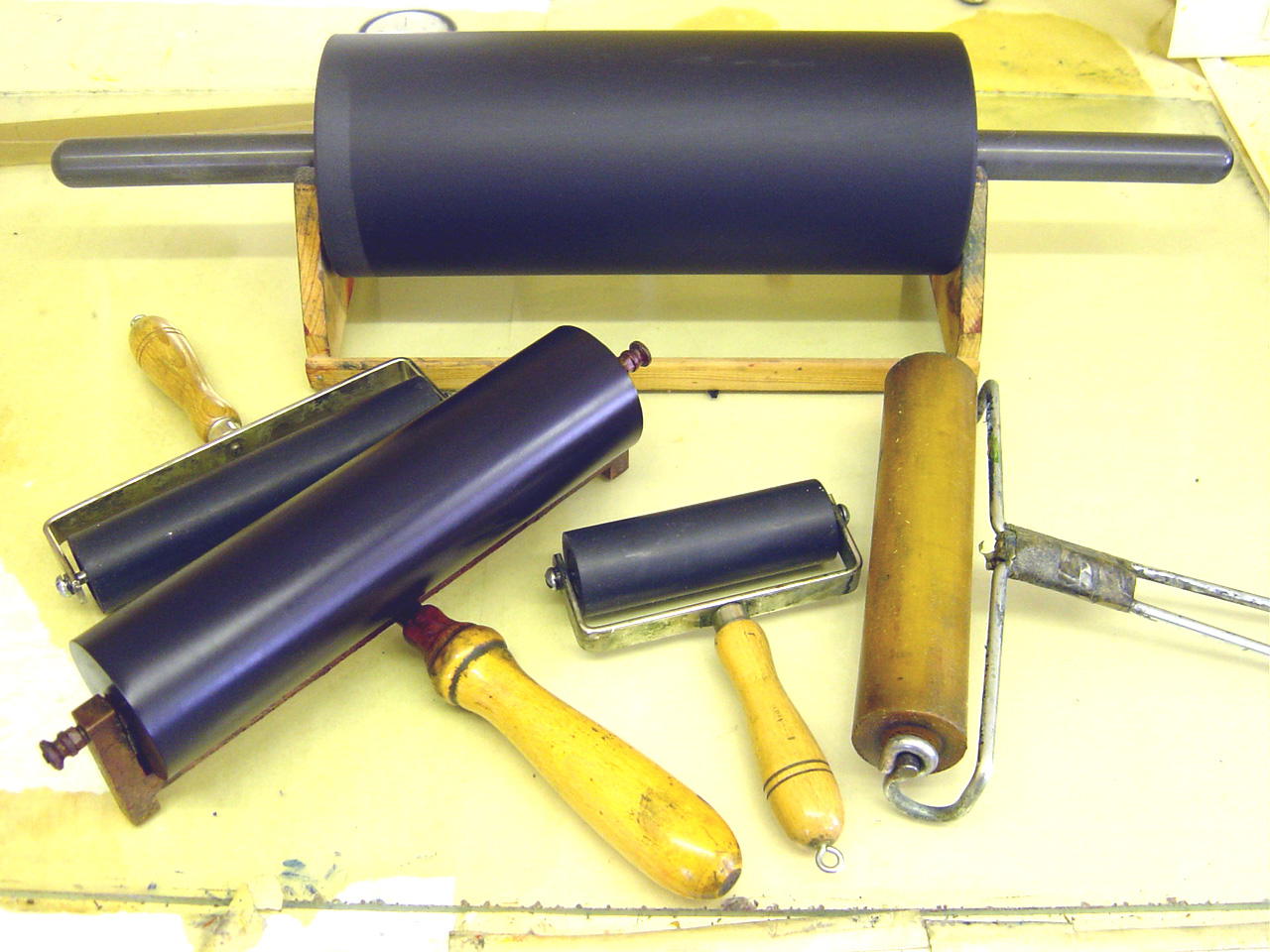
A variety of contemporary rollers ("brayers").

A brayer is a hand-tool used historically in printing and printmaking to break up and "rub out" (spread) ink, before it was "beaten" using inking balls or composition rollers. A brayer consists of a short wooden cylinder with a handle fitted to one end; the other, flat end is used to rub the ink.

== History ==
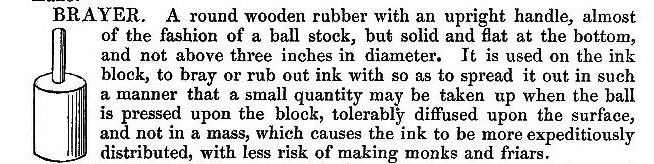
William Savage's definition and illustration of "brayer" in his Dictionary of the art of printing (1841, p. 91).

The word is derived from the verb to "bray", meaning "to break, pound, or grind small, as in a mortar".

In the late nineteenth century the term was applied in the United States to a small hand-roller, "used for spreading ink on the inking table, and for applying it to the distributing plates or rollers connected with presses". Such small rollers were sold as "brayers" from at least 1912 and later in the century the term was applied in the U.S. to hand-rollers of all sorts and sizes. It retains its original meaning in Europe.

== Materials ==
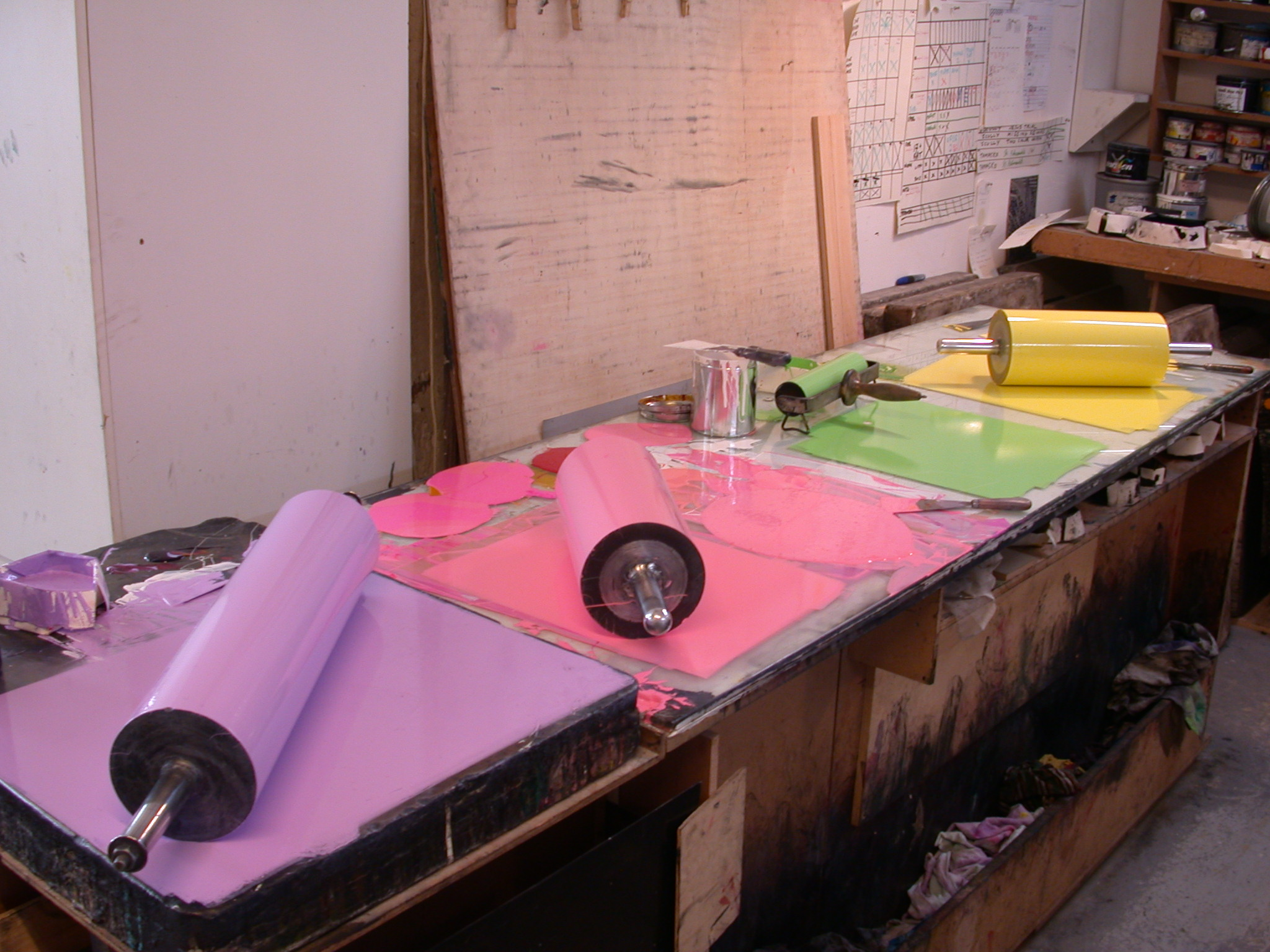
Rollers with handles at each end

Brayers in the original sense were generally made of wood (though Southward refers to their being made of "wood or glass"). Later, rollers could be made of composition, vulcanized rubber, sponge, acrylic, polyurethane or leather. They are formed around a shaft or core and often attached to a wooden handle. Some rollers have an all-metal support, while larger examples may have two handles to allow for two-handed use (to allow the heavy roller to be controlled and in some cases to apply additional pressure).

== Process ==
The printer uses an ink knife to lay out a "pad", mound or streak of ink on a smooth inking plate, originally made of polished metal or stone. The ink is then rubbed with the brayer until an area is smooth enough to beat with the ink balls or roller. In contemporary printmaking, commercially available inks are often smooth and soft enough that they do not require braying before they can be rolled (and thus a more-fragile glass sheet may be used as an inking plate). The roller is passed systematically across the surface to produce an even layer of ink. The roller is then applied to the forme, block, stone or plate so that the ink is evenly transferred to the raised or receptive areas before the next stage of transferring the ink, by moderate pressure, to the printing surface or offset substrate.

== Uses ==
Brayers are rarely used in contemporary printing and printmaking to break up and spread ink, except in cases of historical reconstruction or when a printer has made their own ink and it is too thick to spread without the use of a brayer. Rollers are primarily used for relief printing, leather rollers almost exclusively in lithography and sponge rollers are used only for paint, scrapbooking and other craft applications.

== See also ==
- Baren (printing tool)
- Ink ball
- Composition roller
- Paint roller
