= Composition roller =

Letterpress printing tool

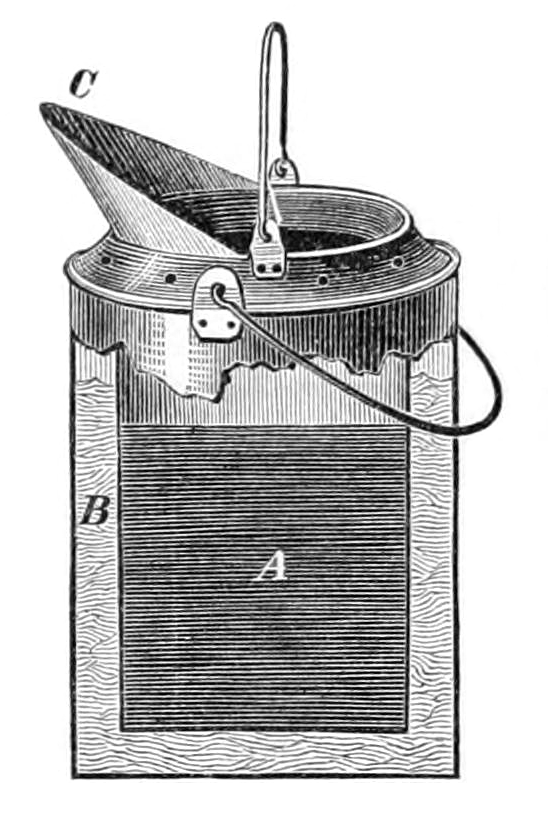
A kettle used for making composition. "A" indicates the liquid composition mixture, "B" the outer area filled with water forming a heated bath.

A composition roller is a tool used in letterpress printing to apply ink to a bed of type in a printing press. It consists of a cylinder made of a substance known as "roller composition" or simply "composition", a mixture of hide glue and sugar (in the form of molasses or treacle), with various additives such as glycerin depending on the particular recipe. Early recipes also included gypsum plaster and tar, though these were eventually found unnecessary.

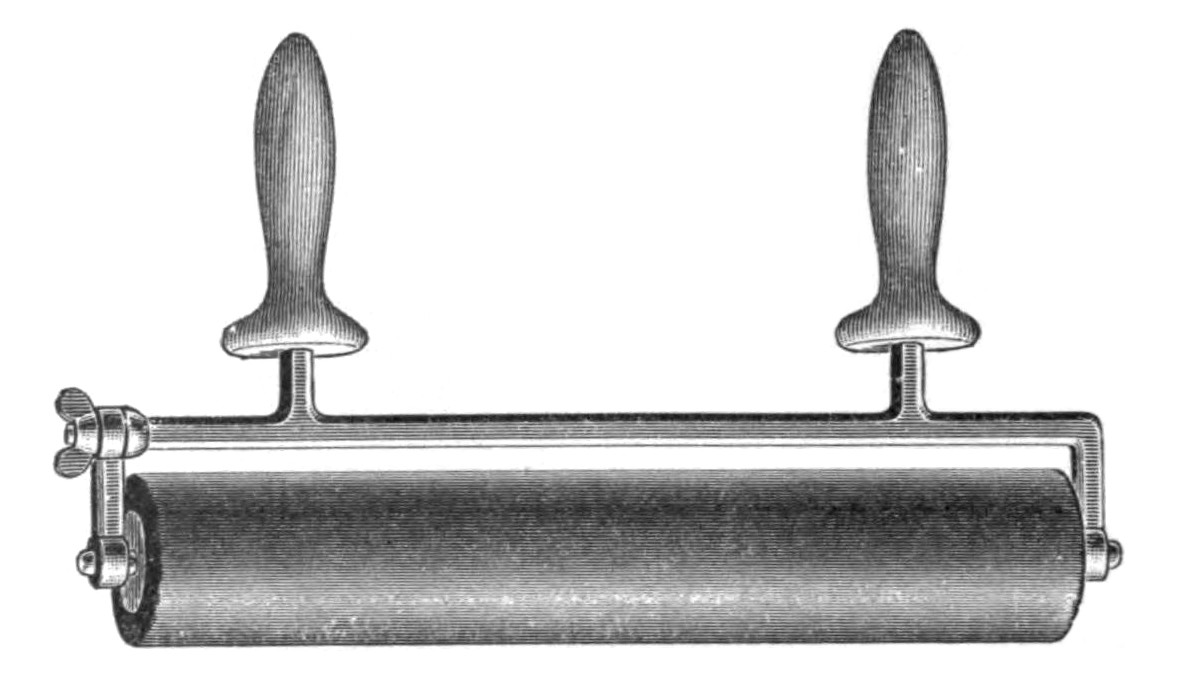
A two-handled composition hand roller, for use in manually inking type

Before its invention, most inking of printing presses was done by manually pounding the type with ink balls, specially treated leather balls stuffed with wool. The difficulty and time involved in making and using ink balls led to various attempts to use cylinders, which could be rolled rather than pounded. Leather rollers (or "skin rollers") were attempted, and were used on the earliest steam-powered cylinder presses, yet these did not work as well as the ink balls, and the stitching seam would appear on the printed type.

Eventually, a substance was found with the right adhesion and elasticity to make suitable cylindrical rollers. Composition for use in inking was developed in England in the 1810s by Robert Harrild and another individual named Forster; they first used it for making ink balls, though they soon turned to making rollers. Bryan Donkin was the first to apply the composition roller to a machine press. By 1826, such rollers had been introduced into the United States.

To make a roller, the ingredients are melted together in a double-boiler kettle. The process is timed to avoid candying the molasses. The mixture is cast into molds around a wooden or metal "stock" or core, which after cooling and seasoning is then hooked onto the handle or printing press.

The performance of composition rollers was notoriously subject to their environmental conditions. Composition rollers tend to quickly dry out, shrink, and harden, and as a result are typically stored in sealed cabinets called "roller closets", often with a thin layer ink left on the roller as a form of protection. Glycerin, which has an affinity for moisture, was eventually added to the recipe, yet that in turn could cause trouble in warm humid weather where too much moisture would be absorbed. The mixture itself varied depending on the time of year in which they were made, with winter rollers sometimes melting in summer, and rollers made in the summer becoming brittle in winter. However, composition rollers that hardened or otherwise were unusable could be melted down and recast.

By the turn of the 20th century, composition rollers were mass-manufactured by various companies, using machines that could cast several rollers at once, using a mixture containing more glycerin than molasses.

== See also ==
- Brayer
- Ink ball
