= Technical Pan =

Photographic film

- Maker: Eastman Kodak
- Speed: 25/15°
- Type: B&W print
- Process: Gelatin-silver
- Format: 35 mm, 120, 4×5 in, 8x10 in
- Grain: Ultrafine
- Discontinued: 2004

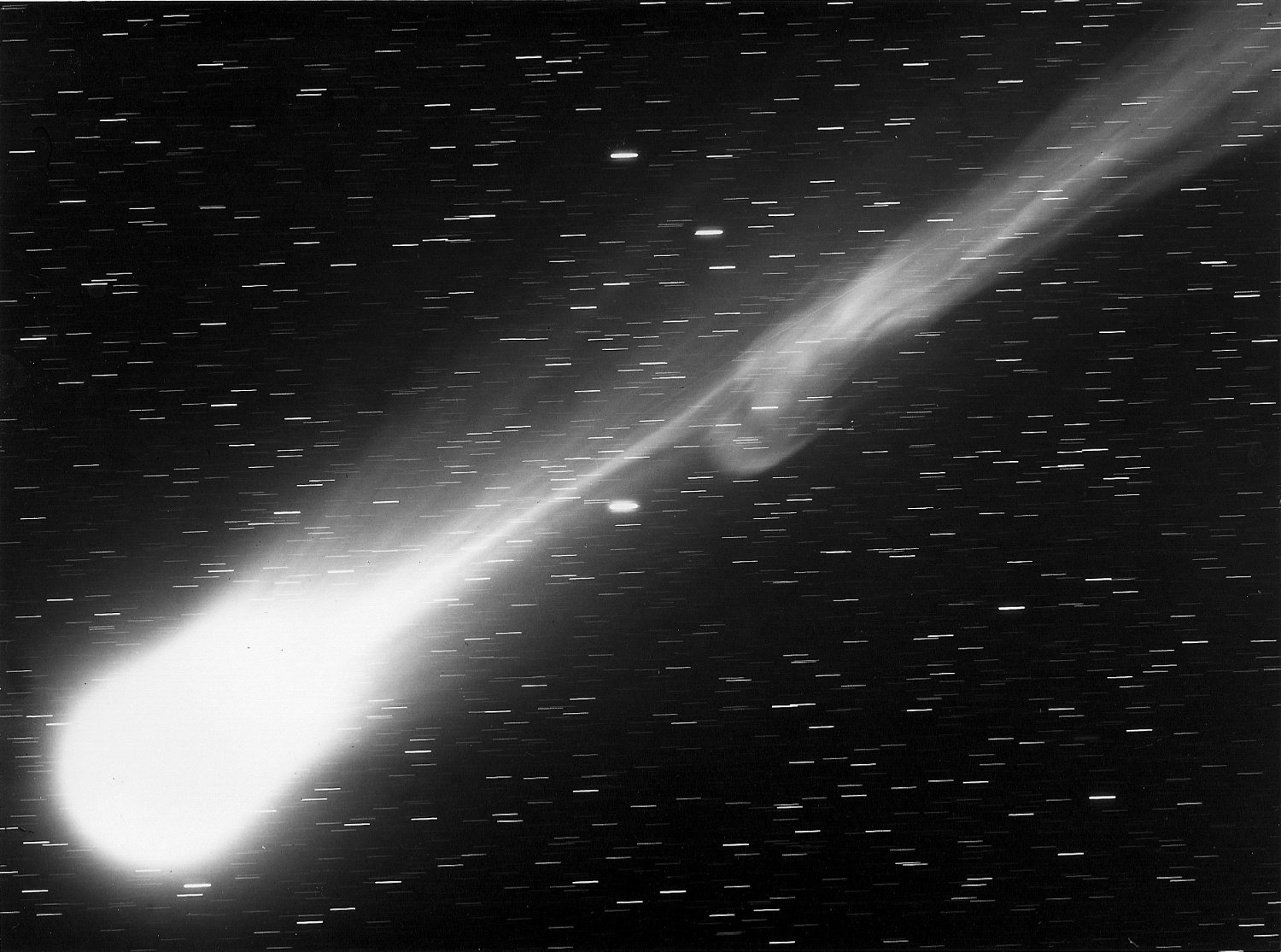
Image of comet C/1996 B2 (Hyakutake), taken with a 225 mm f/2.0 Schmidt camera on Kodak Technical Pan 6415 film. 10 minute exposure.

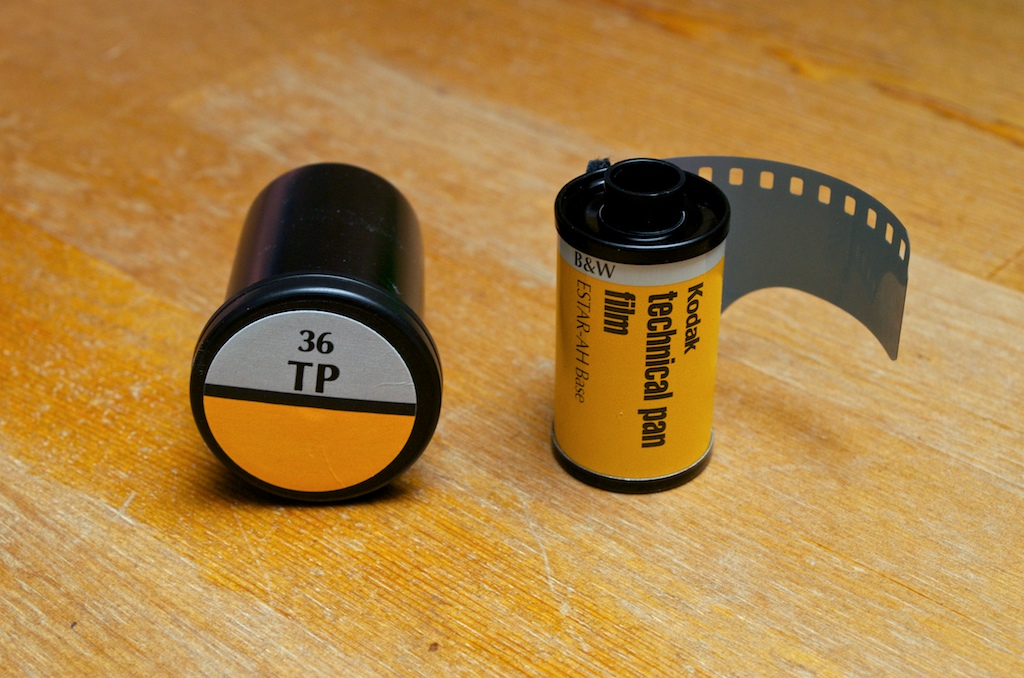
An unused roll of Kodak Technical Pan 35 mm film.

Technical Pan is an almost panchromatic black-and-white film that was produced by Kodak. While it can reproduce the visible light spectrum, it leans to the red, and so unfiltered outdoor shots render blues, most notably the sky, with additional darkening and reds with some lightening. It was generally used as a very slow film, rated at EI 25 or even 16, although it could be rated at up to EI 320 with a distinct loss of tonal range and a bunching of shadow and highlight detail. This film has an unmatched fine grain, especially when rated at a low speed, and makes excellent enlargements while preserving fine details. Kodak stopped selling it in 2004. It has not been replaced by a film (from any manufacturer) with its characteristics (although Kodak's own Panchromatic Separation Film 2238, a motion-picture lab film used for making archival positives, has been referred to as "poor man's Tech Pan" due to similar properties). Although some of its particularities were unique and no emulsion in actual production could replace it, its resolution capabilities were surpassed by another film by ADOX, CMS 20 II.

Technical Pan is a continuous tone film emulsion that was made panchromatic through the addition of sensitizing dyes, as is the case with all panchromatic films. If developed in a general-purpose developer such as D-76, Tech Pan displays extreme contrast. It becomes a pictorial film when developed by a very low-contrast developer.

The film can be developed at home, mainly by using the chemical mixture Technidol, which Kodak sold for that purpose alone. Other two-bath "split" developers have been used on Tech Pan as well as highly dilute developers such as Agfa's Rodinal. To achieve exact results, small-tank development was often the preferred process and "clip testing" (developing a small piece cut from a roll to test developing times and dilutions) was usually done. Like other panchromatic films, it must be developed in darkness.

When the film was discontinued, Kodak revealed that none had been made for many years nor could any more be made because the coating line had been shut down and many of the materials used to make it had been discontinued, and was still on the market only due to a large roll being found in frozen storage. The film was created for the military and was no longer required for that purpose. Consequently, Kodak cut the roll into commercially viable formats and continued to sell it. Unexposed Technical Pan is now quite valuable.

Tech Pan or Technipan, as it is often known, was very popular among some professional photographers and astronomers, as it is capable of recording extremely fine detail, and its sensitivity curve extended much further into the red than most films. In particular, it was very sensitive to light emitted by hydrogen at 656.28 nm (H-alpha), which made it very useful for a wide range of astronomical imaging. Tech Pan was also useful for electron and laser photography. The film was popular with photographers in the art and fashion industries for its extremely high-contrast results when up-rated and processed in an abrasive, high-strength developer.

This description comes from Kodak publication No. P-255, copyright 1985:

KODAK Technical Pan Film is a black-and-white panchromatic negative film with extended red sensitivity. The 2415 Film is available in both 35 mm and 4 x 5-inch sizes; it has a dimensionally stable 4-mil (100 μm) ESTHAR-AH Base with a built-in 0.1-density dye that suppresses light piping. The 6415 Film is available in 120 size with a 3.6-mil acetate base. Both 2415 and 6415 Films have good latent-image keeping and a dyed-gel backing to suppress halation and curl.
