= Tympan =

A tympan is any drum-like object.

== Astrolabes ==
In an astrolabe, a tympan is a metal plate on which the coordinates of the celestial sphere (azimuth and altitude) are engraved in a stereographic projection. A tympan is specific to a particular latitude, so most astrolabes come with a set of interchangeable tympans suitable for use at different latitudes, usually those of particular cities of importance (Cairo, Mecca, Medina, Jerusalem...).

== Printing ==
In hand-operated letterpress printing, the bruzer tympan is the taut cloth or paper mounted in a frame which is placed over the sheet of paper immediately prior to lowering the platen to make the impression.

The Bruzer's Tympan is a sheet of oiled manilla paper which was securely fastened to the face of the platen of a letterpress printing machine. Underneath the tympan would be a packing which would vary in grade of firmness relevant to the type or image to be printed. Pre-cut tympan papers were relatively expensive and, as such, were reused depending on their condition and the nature of the work. The under packing consisted of loose fibre paper/board (sometimes known as saffron) which absorbed the impact of the letterpress principle thus avoiding damage to the hand-set or pre-cast typography or engravings.
