= Ink ball =

Tool used in printmaking

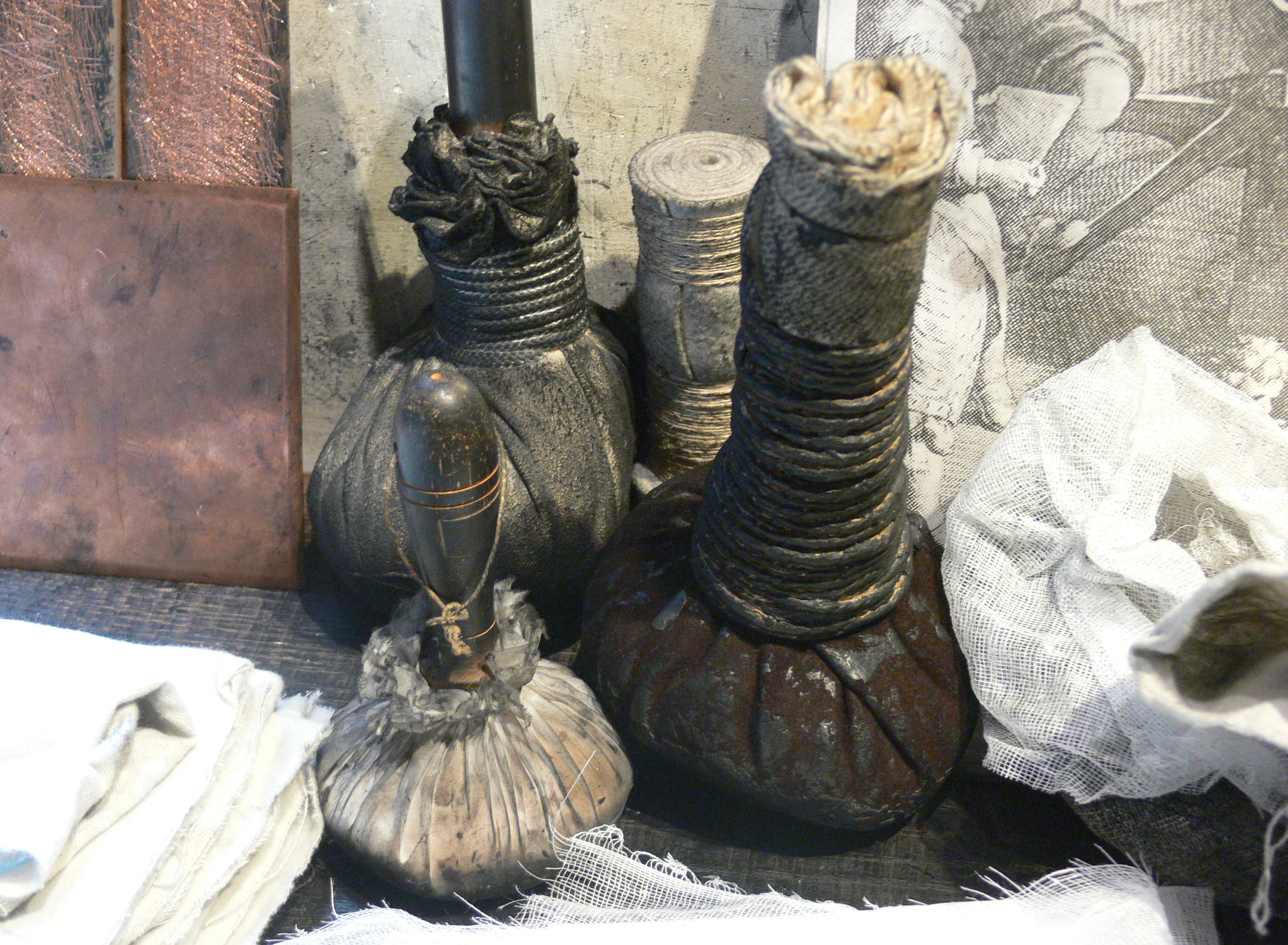
Several ink balls at the Rembrandt House Museum, Amsterdam

An ink ball, inking ball, or dabber is a tool used in printmaking and letterpress printing to apply ink to the plate or type to be printed. It consists of a piece of specially-treated sheep, calf or dog leather stuffed with wool, with a wooden handle.

Ink balls had been used since the dawn of the printing press in the 15th century. In printmaking, they were used individually, to make the ink smooth and apply it. In letterpress printing, they were used in pairs: ink was placed on one of the two balls, which were then held together and worked around until a proper thickness, consistency, and uniformity was reached. The inker then "beat" the type to apply the ink, making sure to get neither too much nor too little ink on the form.

A photo showing two ink balls (dabbers) stored on a rack on the left side of a reproduction Duerer press. Located in the Bibliographical Press, part of the Bodleian Library, Oxford, UK.

By the mid- to late-19th century, they had been largely superseded by the composition roller (a cylinder made from a mixture of glue with molasses or tar) and the rubber roller or "brayer". The replacing of the labor-intensive ink balls, which had to be worked by hand, with mechanized rollers was a key factor to the growth of mechanized printing machines in the 19th century.
