= Coign =

Coign is an older spelling of Quoin, and may refer to:

- Coign (architecture), masonry blocks at the corner of a wall
- Coign (gunnery), a wedge used in aiming a cannon
- Coign (printing), wooden or metal wedges used for locking printing type into a chase
- A coign, in Crystallography, is the point at which three facets of a crystal meet
- A coign, in Geology, is an angular plate around which a continent has formed

== See also ==
- Coign of vantage, an elevated observation point
- Coign and livery, military exactions in Gaelic Ireland
