= Furniture (disambiguation) =

Furniture is the mass noun for the movable objects intended to support various human activities such as seating and sleeping.

Furniture may also refer to:

- Furniture (band), a British new wave band
- Furniture (EP), an EP by Fugazi
- Furniture (page layout), items on a page other than main text and images
- "Furniture" (song), a song by Amy Studt
- Furniture (typesetting)
- The stock, including shoulder butt and handgrips, of a firearm
- Horse furniture, equipment or accessories equipped on horses and other equines
- Book furniture, straps and clasps used in bookbinding
