= Stereotype (printing) =

Solid plate resulting from the application of a stereotyping technique

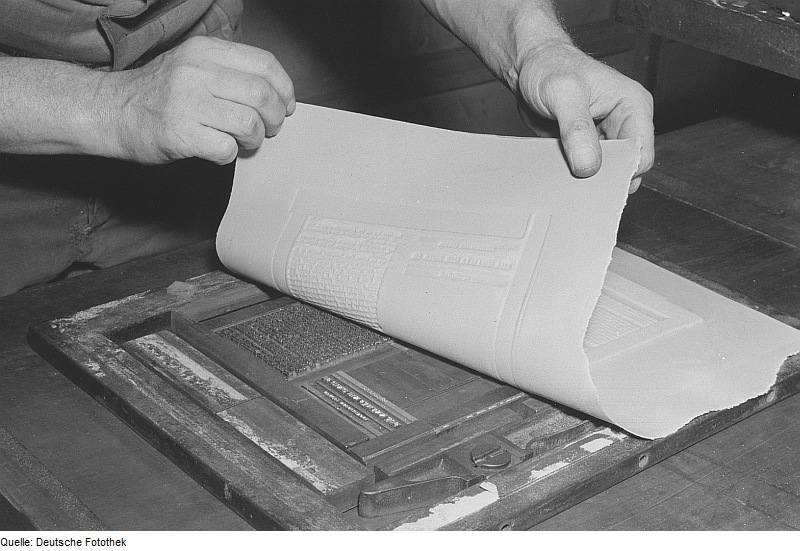
A stereotype mould ("flong") being made

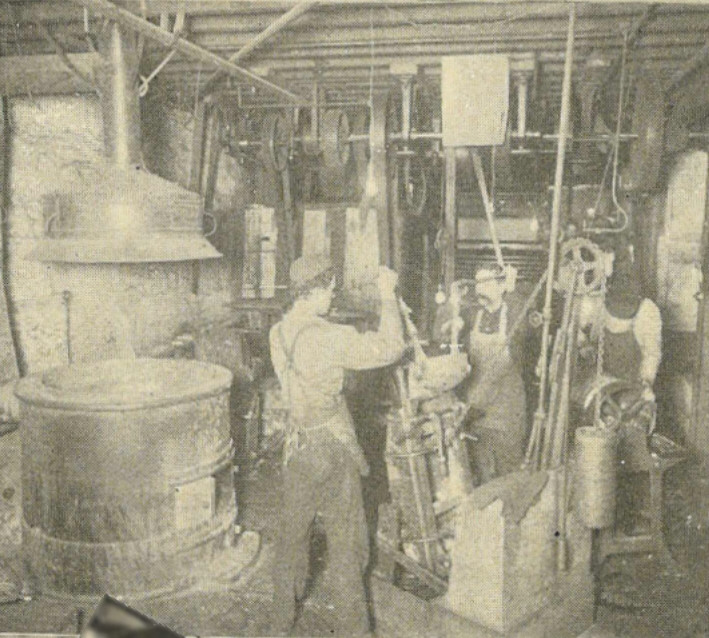
Stereotype casting room of the Seattle Daily Times, c. 1900

In printing, a stereotype, stereoplate or simply a stereo, is a solid plate of type metal, cast from a papier-mâché or plaster mould taken from the surface of a forme of type. The mould was known as a flong.

== Background ==
In the days of set movable type, printing involved placing individual letters (also called “sort”) plus other elements (including leading and furniture) into a block called a chase. Cumulatively, this full setup for printing a single page was called a forme. Ink was then applied to the forme, pressed against paper and a printed page was made. This process of creating formes was labour-intensive, costly and prevented printers from using their type, leading, furniture and chases for other work. Furthermore, printers who underestimated demand would be forced to reset the type for subsequent print runs.

... while Nathaniel Hawthorne's publishers assumed that The Scarlet Letter (1850) would do well, printing an uncharacteristically large edition of 2,500 copies, popular demand for Hawthorne's controversial "Custom House" introduction outstripped supply, prompting Ticknor & Fields to reset the type and to reprint another 2,500 copies within two months of the first publication. Still unaware that they had an incipient classic on their hands, Ticknor & Fields neglected at this time to invest in stereotype plates, and thus were forced to pay to reset the type for a third time just four months later when they finally stereotyped the book.

While stereotypes were useful in book publishing, it was in newspaper publishing that they came into their own. Books were normally printed not as single pages but as sets of multiple pages at a time. Thus a single-volume 320-page book needed 40 stereos for an eight-page imposition, or twenty stereos for a 16-page imposition. This contrasts with newspapers where a Sunday edition of a major newspaper could require as many as 6,000 stereos. (Note: The number is so high because multiple presses were used, and because there were different editions, as the news changed during the printing, as well as zonal or geographical editions with different advertising, etc.)

== Advantages of stereotypes ==
Stereotype offered the following advantages:

- They allowed the printer to immediately break down and redistribute the expensive original type, thus reducing the amount of set-up original type the printer needed to keep on hand. In some cases, contracts with publishers required printers to keep type set up for anything up to six months in case further editions were needed. (Note: The Incorporated Society of Author's specimen agreement between an author and a publisher for publication on a royalty after costs basis included the provision that type, once set up for the book, should be kept standing for six months (to facilitate additional print runs if the book sold well).)
- Facilitated the distribution of the set-up type to other printers, as stereos were far lighter and less fragile than formes full of type. This was particularly important for syndicated news services.
- Facilitated the storage of set-up type. Stereos were far lighter and more compact than formes full of type. This meant that the printer could practically store them rather than having to set up the work again. In 1910, for example, Hodder and Stoughton republished G. A. Henty's Friends Though Divided: A Tale of the Civil War, printing the book (except for the preliminary pages) from the stereotypes used for the initial 1883 edition by Griffith and Farran. The same stereos were used for reprinting in 1917 and in the 1920s. When they sold a copyright to another publisher, publishers often sold the stereotypes as well. Stereo plates could be stored for several decades. A large number of such stored stereotypes were melted down in 1916 in the UK in support of the war effort.
- Enabled the printer to quickly set up multiples of the same text so that they could print a given text, e.g. for a handbill, several times on the same sheet of paper and then separate them. This was faster and cheaper than doing them individually.
- Enabled the same text to be printed on multiple presses at the same time. Dalgin gives the example of one instance where thirty stereos were produced from a single flong for this purpose and states that there is no reason why more could not have been cast.

== Invention ==
English sources often describe the process as having been invented in 1725 by William Ged, who apparently stereotyped plates for the Bible at Cambridge University before abandoning the business. However, Count Canstein had been publishing stereotyped Bibles in Germany since 1712 and an earlier form of stereotyping from flong was described in Germany in 1702. It is even possible that the process was used as early as the fifteenth century by Johannes Gutenberg or his heirs for the Mainz Catholicon. Wide application of the technique, with improvements, is attributed to Charles Stanhope in the early 1800s. Printing plates for the Bible were stereotyped in the US in 1814.

== Moulding materials ==
The following have been used for moulding type to create stereos:

- Clay. Invented by a French printer, Gabriel Valleyre in 1730. He pressed the set-up forme in clay or other earthy substance to make a reverse image, and then poured molten copper into the mould. His copies were not very good, due either to the clay he was using, or the softness of the copper. However, the method was later revived, improved, and used by Government Printing Office in Washington, D.C. Hoe & Company included a range of plant for use with the process in their 1881 catalogue.
- Plaster of Paris. Gress was already describing this as an old method that had been displaced by the papier-mâché or paper process in 1909.. The plaster process can reproduce finer lines than the paper process, but has the disadvantage that the mould is broken to remove the stereo. This was the process developed by Ged in 1725, where a plaster mould is made of the set-up type. The process was perfected in 1802, but because there were relatively few books that needed repeated print-runs other than bibles or schoolbooks, the process did not come into widespread use for another two decades. The Bank of England printed its notes using stereos from plaster moulds in 1816. Lord Stanhope had invested a considerable sum of money in developing the process, and he then established and funded a stereotyping plant in London.. However it was not a commercial success and faced considerable opposition from the printing trade.. David noted that it was only with the introduction of the flexible and robust papier-mâché flong in the 1850 that led to the extensive use of stereotyping for book production.
- Papier-mâché or paper or wet process. In this process, a number of layers of paper fastened together by a paste made from a range of ingredients, including glue or gum. The paste could be to the stereotyper's own recipe or a proprietary paste. Partridge describes the process as: "A few sheets of thin paper are soaked in water until soft and then pasted together to form a flong. This flong is beaten into a page of type and dried, thus forming a matrix to receive the molten metal, which, when cooled, becomes an exact duplicate of the type page. A large number of duplicate casts may be made from the same matrix, either in flat form as required for flat-bed presses, or curved to fit the cylinders of rotary presses." Gress notes that when first introduced The Times only made papier-mâché flongs of individual columns, but that Charles Craske of the New-York Tribune developed the method to make flongs of entire pages.
- Dry mat, or dry matrix process. Here there is no need to beat the matrix into the page of type, but simple pressure is enough. The pressures needed are quite high and effectively require a hydraulic press. By 1946, the dry mat process had completely taken over in newspaper publishing in the United States.

The process for making moulds for electrotypes was similar, except that these were made with soft materials such as beeswax or the naturally occurring mineral wax ozokerite. The thin electrotype shells had to be backed with type metal to a depth of 8mm to make them robust enough for use.

== Making the stereotypes ==
After moulding the stereotype it is carefully removed from the mould. If locking the flong into a moulding box, the box was pivoted so that the flong was in the vertical plane, and liquid type metal was poured into the mould. For newspapers these moulds were cylindrical in shape. This quickly cooled, and the mould was opened to remove the stereo. The stereo might be cooled further. The back of the stereo was then shaved, to reduce it to the required thickness for the press. The stereo was also trimmed and had the edges bevelled (to enable the stereo to be clamped into place). The stereos were then clamped into place on the printing cylinder, and the print run began.

Type metal is an alloy of lead, tin, and antimony. Lead on its own makes type too soft to be of use. Tin was added to lead to make it harder, but the results were unsatisfactory. It was found that adding both tin and antimony led to type that was hard and therefore resistant to wear and distortion, resulting in sharp reproductions.

The lowest solidification point for a liquid lead, antimony, and tin alloy occurs when the antimony content is twelve percent, known as the eutectic alloy. (Note: The word comes from the Greek εὔτηκτος, εὐ- easily, and τήκ-ειν to melt. The term is used to refer to alloys which have a lower melting point than their constituents, or to the proportions of a mixture with the lowest melting point of any proportions of that mixture. While the eutectic type metal alloy melts at 252°C, the melting point for lead is 327°C, for Antimony is 630°C, and for tin 232°C.) Keeping the antimony content close to twelve percent ensured the lowest possible melting point, important for slug-casting machines which melted an alloy ingot for casting the slugs. Low melting point is also important for the metal used for stereos as very high temperatures would damage the flongs. The type metal used for stereos was slightly different from the type metal used for foundry type, slug casting machines like the Linotype machine, individual letter casting machines as in the Monotype machine, or the metal used for backing electrotypes. While increasing the antimony content increases hardness, the tin content must be increased in proportion to achieve this.

Fry's offered the following guide to type metal for different uses.

Composition of type metal alloys for different uses
Intended use of the type metal	Tin %	Antimony %	Lead %	Notes
Backing for electrotypes	2–4	2–4	92–96	(Note: Electotypes were backed as the thin copper shell could not be printed from directly. The process of backing consisted of applying a thin sheet of tin foil to a heated electro shell, allowing it to melt, and then pouring on the type metal. The finished type metal backing is 8mm thick.)
Slug casting machines such as the Linotype	3.5–4	11.5–12	84–85	(Note: The line of type that Linotype, Intertype, or Typograph machines cast was called a slug, hence the name slug-caster.)
Stereotype plates	5–10	15	75–80	
Type casting machines such as the Monotype	6–13	15–19	68–81	
Foundry type metal for manual type-casting	13–22	20–28	50–67	

The golden rule for stereotyping was to have cool metal and a hot box to avoid problems with shrinkage cavities or sinks. Sometimes a casting board was used to slow the cooling at the back of the casting, as this could help to avoid problems due to the flong being a poor conductor.

== Scale of stereotyping ==
In 1946, Dalgin stated that the New York Times had one hundred slug-casting machines They consumed eight tons of type metal a night. However the stereotype department was casting seven times as much metal with a consumption of 45 tons of type metal every night and 150 tons on Saturday (for the large Sunday edition). They cast as many as 6,000 plates for the Sunday edition.

Not only that, but the time limit for composition to press-printing time was short. The last pages (typically the front page and pages with stories running on from the front page) were locked-up in their formes, and then the team had fifteen minutes to mould the matrices, cast, shave, trim, cool the stereos and place them on the presses. Kjaer reported that the time from delivery of a forme to the stereotype foundry to onward delivery of a plate to the press room had fallen from eight minutes in 1916 to four minutes in 1926.

== Newspaper syndication and stereotypes ==
Initially syndicated news took the form of distributing printed sheets. In December 1841 the owner of the Sun had the then US president's address to congress couriered to him. He then printed it on a single sheet, and sold the sheets to newspapers in the surrounding regions, keeping the body, but changing the title head to suit the newspapers. The next effort was to have sheets printed with the president's address on one side and local news on the other. (Note: This is the approach seen today with church news sheets, where one side is professionally printed with common material, and the other sides is locally printed with parish specific news.) However, matters improved with improvements in stereotyping and the table summarised Kubel's relation of the growth of stereotyping for syndication.

Period	Method of distribution of syndicated materials
Up to 1850	Via printed sheets, with either one or both sides printed
1850–1883	Via printed sheets and stereotype plates
From 1883	Largely via stereotype plates
From 1895	Flongs began to replace plates
By 1941	Flongs had almost completely replaced plates

The flongs distributed were not just syndicated articles or comic strips, but also advertisements. This had a huge advantage in that newspapers avoided the costs of setting these up in type. In some cases flongs were distributed with sections that could be cut out where a local store name could be inserted, so that an illustrated advertisement for a particular product could include the name of the local dealer. Newspapers combined a set of flongs to cast the stereotype plate for a page. In some cases, news printers would produce a flong, cast a plate from that flong, combine that plate with other elements to make a page or a spread, and produce a second-generation flong of the whole page, and the cast a plate from that flong.

== End of the process ==
Stereotyping was first challenged by electrotyping, which was more expensive and time-consuming, but was capable of higher quality printing. It was initially reserved for making copper facsimiles of illustrations. With time, Weedon states that in book publishing, it became more important than stereotyping. However, Kubler stated, in 1941, that in contrast to the United States, which made greater use of electrotyping, European plants used stereotype plates of 75% of all letterpress reproduction work, and that the best stereotype work was equal to the best electrotype work. (Note: Kubler was selling flong mats for stereotyping, so it is hardly surprising that he made such a claim about quality. The general view was that electrotypes are capable of higher quality reproduction than stereotypes.) However, stereotyping retained its primacy in newspaper publishing. Kubler states that alternatives to stereotyping either involved significant additional capital costs or were unsuited for newspapers as they did not allow corrections and the insertion of late news and local materials or were both expensive and unsuitable. (Note: Three of the competing processes described by Kubler involved the use of mercury, either as a drip or as admixture with the ink. This would have been a significant hazard for the printers.) (Note: With stereotypes, changes and corrections could be accommodated by cutting out part of the flong and replacing it with a new section.) The first computer-aided typeset book in the UK was Dylan Thomas' Collected Poems in 1966, but the process really took off in the 1970s, creating enormous disruption in the newspaper industry.

The introduction of offset printing meant that hot-metal type was no longer needed, and phototypesetting replaced the hot-metal type machines. This meant that there was no longer a need for stereotypes. The phototypesetting machines were replaced in their turn by the personal computer and desktop publishing. Kubler's firm that made dry mats dissolved on 13 August 1979.

== Etymologies ==
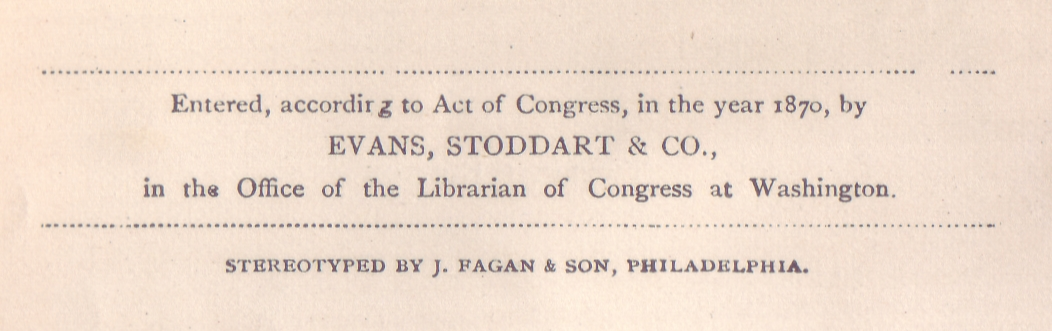
A copyright notice for a book from 1870, using the term stereotyped in its original sense

Over time, stereotype became a metaphor for any set of ideas repeated identically or with only minor changes. In fact, cliché and stereotype were both originally printers' words, and in their printing senses became synonymous. However, cliché originally had a slightly different meaning, being an onomatopoeic word for the sound that was made during the process of striking a block into molten type metal during another form of stereotyping, later called in English dabbing.

The term stereotype derives from Greek στερεός (stereós) "solid, firm" and τύπος (túpos) "blow, impression, engraved mark" and in its modern sense was coined in 1798.

== Writings on stereotyping ==
George Adolf Kubler (1876 – 9 January 1944) (Note: Kubler was born in Sharon, Connecticut, United States, and studied at both LMU Munich and the University of Tübingen in Germany. Earning his Doctorate of Jurisprudence in the latter. He was not only interested in printing but was also a passionate collector of prints. When he died in Newark, New Jersey on 9 January 1944, he left a collection of approximately 66,000, high quality engravings clipped from European and American books and periodicals dating almost exclusively from the 19th century. The collection is now part of the archive at Cooper Hewitt, Smithsonian Design Museum, 2 East 91st Street, New York, N.Y. 10128.) was probably the person who wrote most about the process. He was the founder and president of Certified Dry Mat Corporation. (Note: The company was finally dissolved on 13 August 1979.) The firm made stereotype matrices or flong mats, which were used to first take a mould from the set-up type, and then to cast the stereotype plates. His writing included:

- A Short History of Stereotyping (1927). Kubler printed 6,000 copies of this short book (93 p., 11 leaves of plates, 24 cm) and distributed it mostly to professional stereotypers, with other copies being sent, only if specially requested, to journalism and trade schools, public libraries and printing craft clubs worldwide. It is available online at the HathiTrust.
- Historical Treatises, Abstracts, and Papers on Stereotyping (1936). Slightly longer (vii, 169 p., ill., 8º) than his first book, again dealing with the early history of stereotyping.
- Wet Mat Stereotyping in Germany in 1690 (1937). This was a short pamphlet (6 p.) on wet matrix stereotyping, as opposed to the dry matrix approach which Kubler's company promoted.
- The era of Charles Mahon, third Earl of Stanhope, stereotyper, 1750–1825 (1938). This was an illustrated book (viii, 120p., 29 pl., 23 cm.) about the British statesman and scientist who invented the first iron printing press and experimented with stereotyping. The book was re-issued by Literary Licensing in 2013 ISBN 9781494034917.
- A New History of Stereotyping (1941). This is a wide-ranging book (x, 362 p., ill., 24 cm.) which not only includes a detailed history of the process, but also examines the history of newspaper, alternatives to stereotyping, and even the history of stereotypers' unions. Available on-line at the Internet Archive.

Fleishman provides a thorough and well illustrated explanation of the process in his blog.. Dalgin provides a good overview of the mechanics of newspaper production in the middle of the 20th century, including different methods of reproduction. There are also books on the process such as those by Wilson, Partridge, Hatch and Stewart, and Salade.
