= Reglet (typesetting) =

Wooden spacing used in typesetting

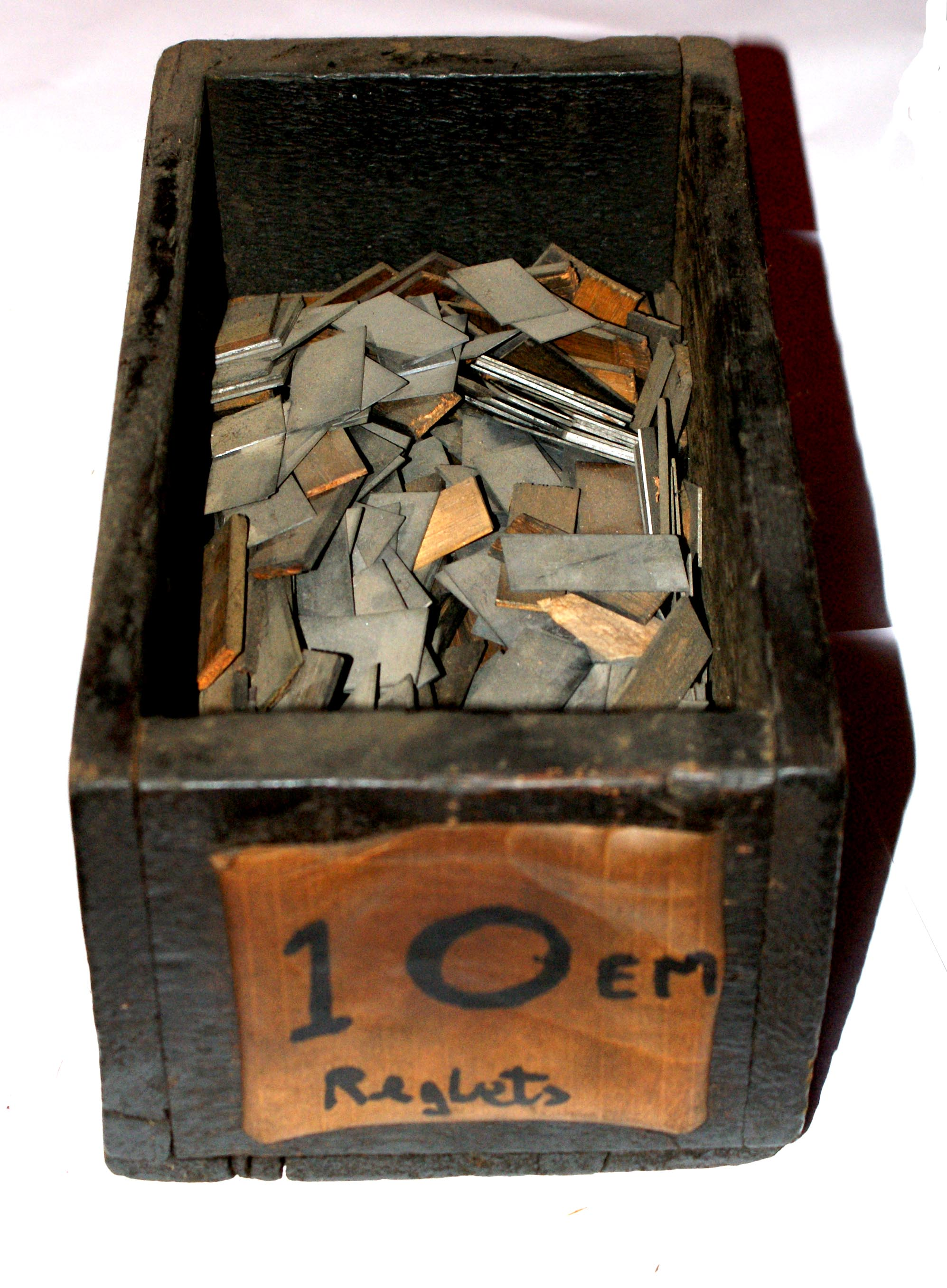
A box of reglets

A reglet is a piece of wooden spacing material used in typesetting, usually to provide spacing between paragraphs, though it is sometimes used to fill in small spaces not taken up by type in the chase.

== See also ==
- Slug (typesetting)
