= Slug (typesetting) =

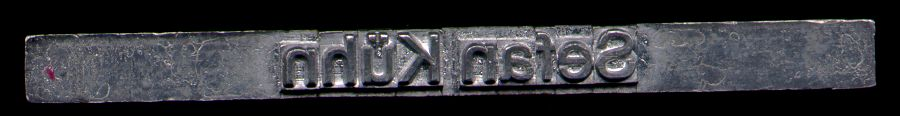
Whole line type slug, print side. When printed, it reads "Sefan Kühn".

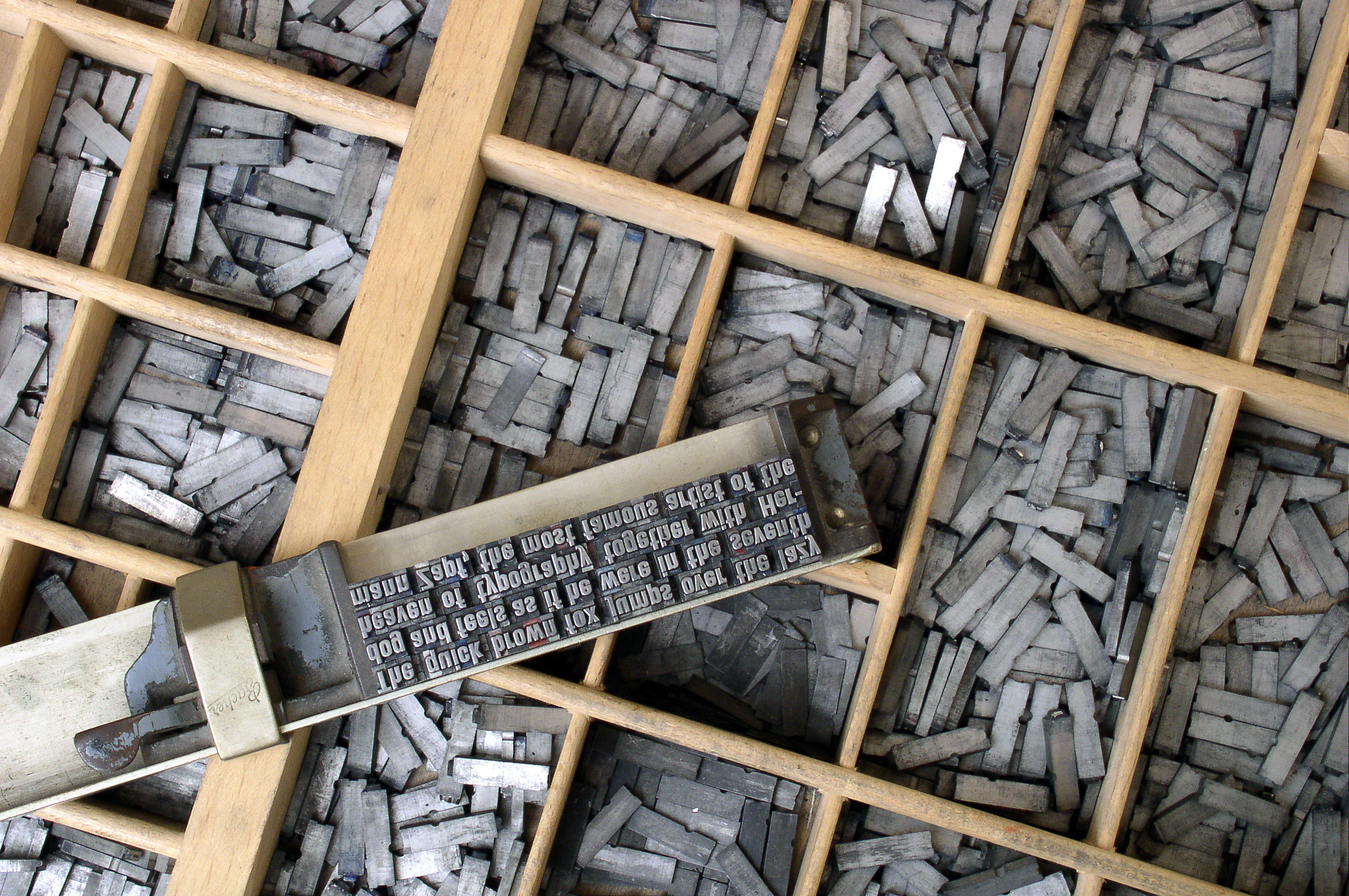
Movable type on a composing stick on a type case, selected from a box of individual sorts

In typesetting, a slug is any of several kinds of piece of lead or other type metal. One kind of slug is a piece of spacing material used to space paragraphs. In the era of commercial typesetting in metal type, they were usually manufactured in strips of 6-point lead. Another kind of slug is a single sort, bearing a single letter or any other symbol. More recently, a slug can be an entire line of Linotype typeset matter, where a single piece of lead has been cast bearing a line of text.

In modern typesetting programs such as Adobe InDesign, slugs hold printing information, customized color bar information, or display other instructions and descriptions for other information in the document. Objects (including text frames) positioned in the slug area are printed but will disappear when the document is trimmed to its final page size.

Slugs, or slug lines, are also the name for incidental typeset lines of type that are intended either for the printer's or binder's benefit (such as a collation mark, a catch line, or a galley slug) or as advertising for the producer of the printed piece (such as a line of type showing the name of the printer, the printer's item number or job number, and the telephone number of the printer in order to make reorders simple).

== Usage in web publishing ==
This term is also used in web publishing to refer to short article labels that may be used as part of a URL. Slugs are usually derived from an article's title and are limited in length, and to a specific set of characters (to prevent percent-encoding); often only letters, numbers, and hyphens are allowed.

== See also ==
- Reglet (typesetting) – Wooden spacing used in typesetting
- Furniture (typesetting) – Pieces of wood used in typesetting
- Leading – In typography, spacing between lines
- Sort (typesetting) – Character printing block
