= Forme =

Element of printing techniques

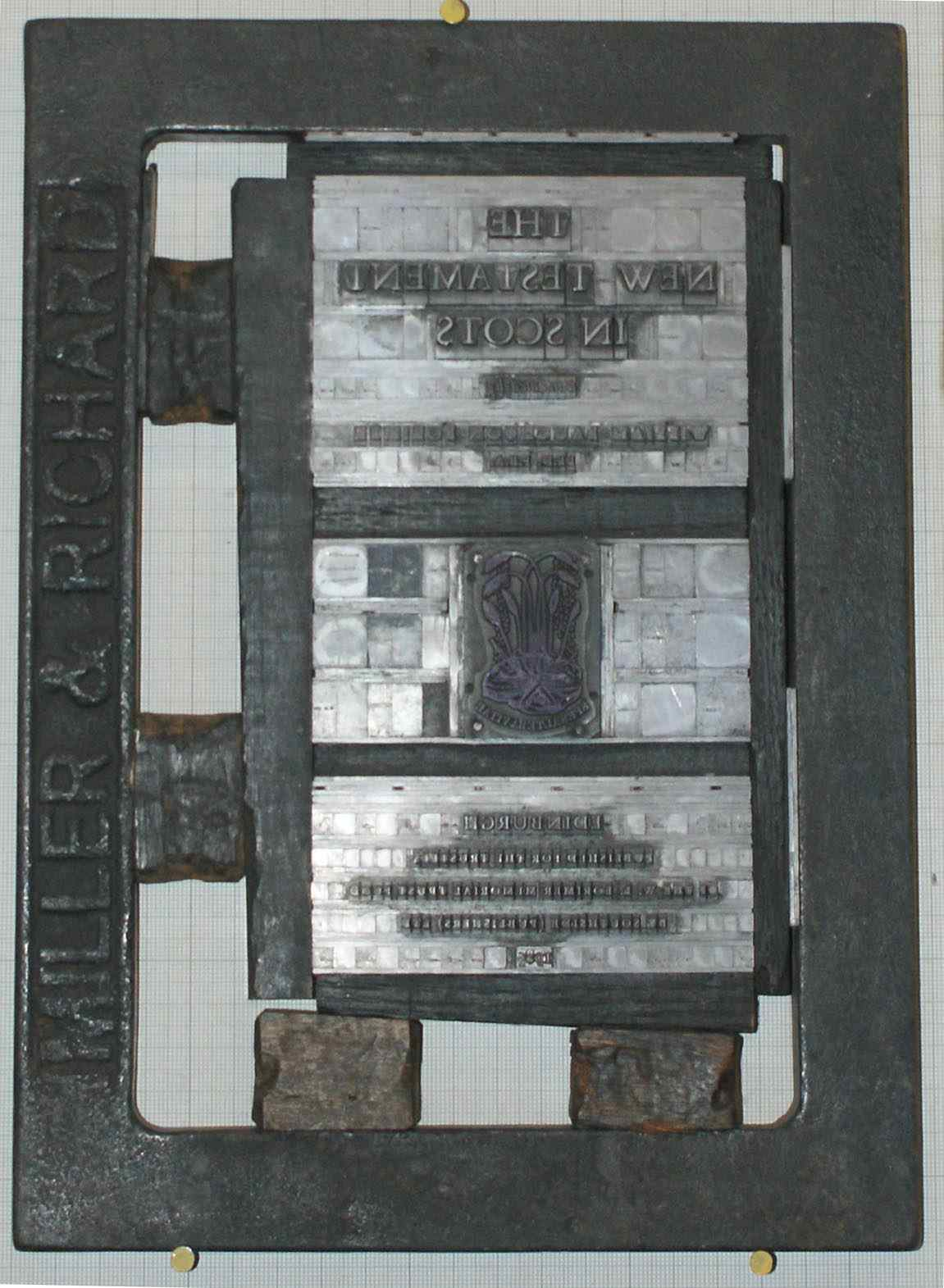
A locked-up forme for printing a single page

In typesetting, a forme (or form) is imposed by a stoneman working on a flat imposition stone when they assemble the loose components of a page (or number of simultaneously printed pages) into a locked arrangement, inside a chase, ready for printing. If metal type is kept locked up in the typeset document for long periods to allow reprint, this is called "standing type". There are many types of formes in printing in general.

The design of the printing surface and the material of the forme depend on the printing process employed. For instance, in letterpress printing, the forme is composed of type or stereotypes made from various materials. In intaglio printing, etched or engraved metallic cylinders are used, while offset printing employs chemically treated metal plates. In screen printing, the forme consists of a mesh with non-printing areas made impermeable to ink. In flexography, printing is done using either a directly engraved rubber cylinder or a digitally imaged photopolymer plate mounted onto a cylinder.

In contrast, non-impact printing processes, such as inkjet printing and laser printing, operate without a physical forme.

== Relief printing ==
In relief printing, the printing elements are raised above the non-printing areas. This category primarily includes letterpress and flexography. Letterpress printing uses hard material formes and highly viscous ink, whereas flexography employs soft material formes and relatively fluid ink.

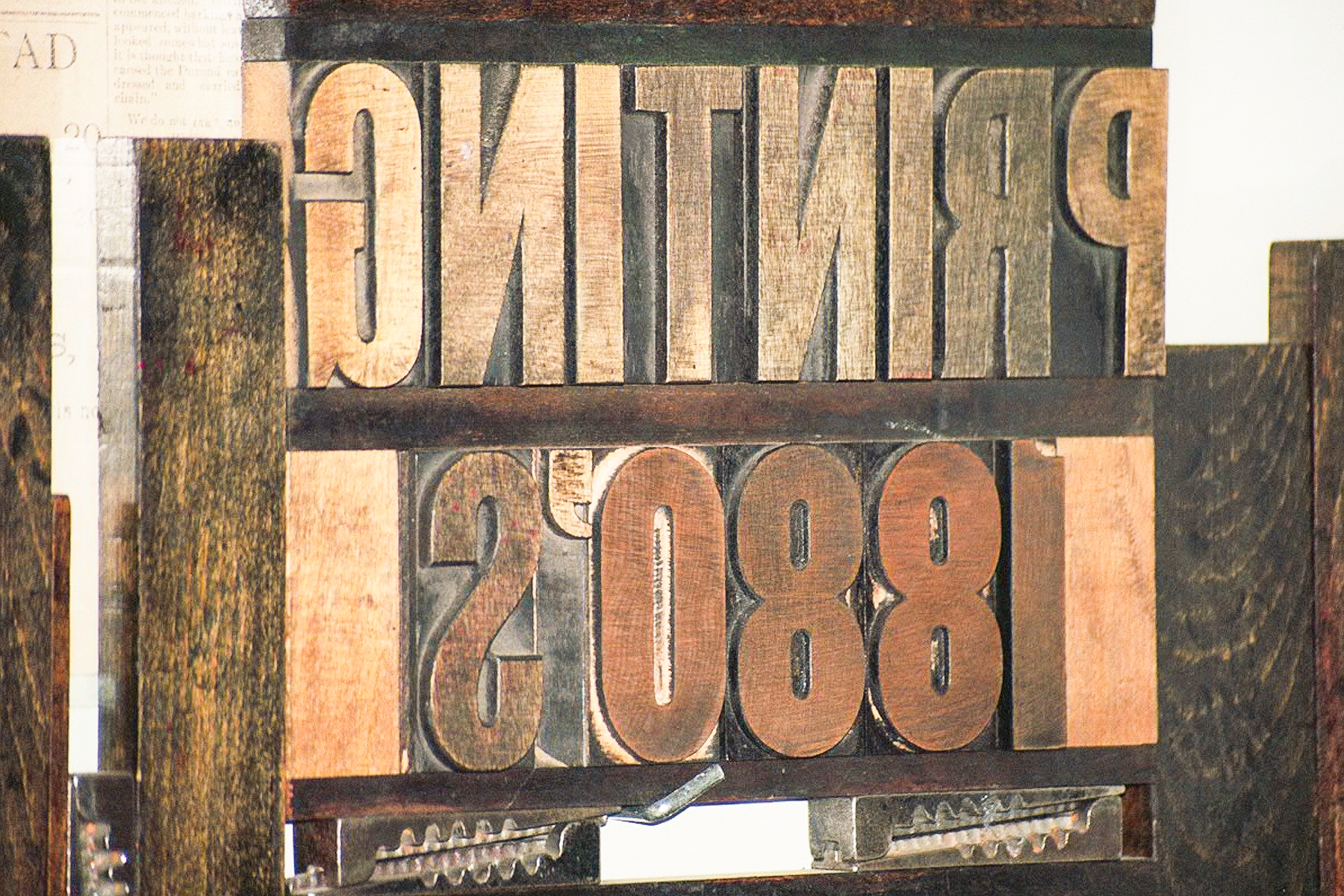
Historical wood type

=== Letterpress ===
Invented around 1450 by Johannes Gutenberg, letterpress is the oldest printing method in Europe and remained the primary method for mass-producing printed materials for nearly five centuries. Initially, the forme consisted of numerous individual types or letters, combined with decorative elements and woodcuts to incorporate text and graphic design.

A significant advancement in forme production came in 1886 with the introduction of the Linotype machine, invented by Ottmar Mergenthaler in the United States. This machine enabled faster typesetting, making vast amounts of text available for printing newspapers, books, and other materials.

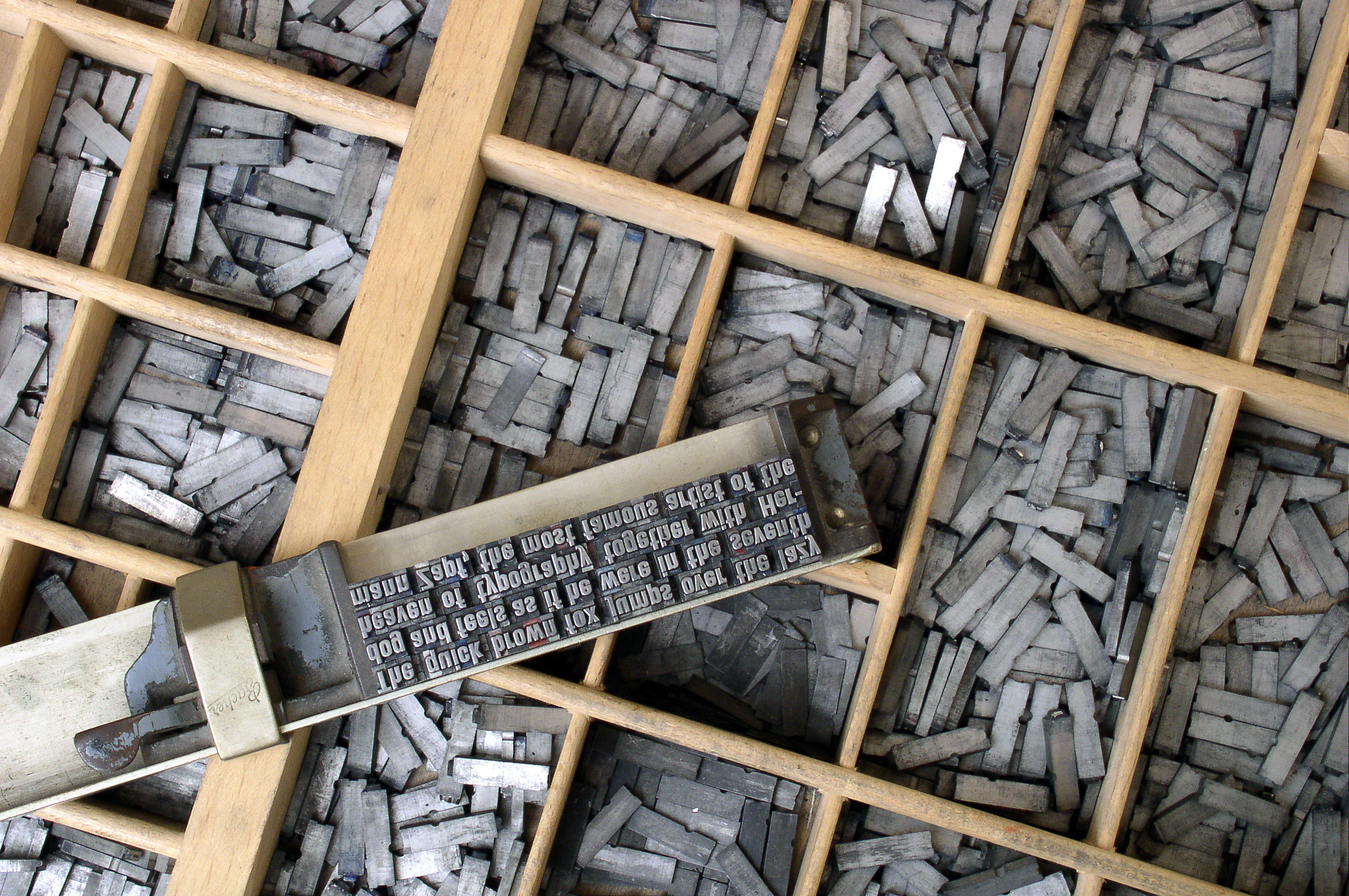
Composing stick and type case

A further development was the stereotype, a metal duplicate created by casting a metal alloy into a matrix. This produced a single-piece forme, replacing the assembly of individual types or lines. Curved stereotype formes were used in rotary printing presses for newspaper printing until the 1970s. The invention of the autotype allowed the printing of rasterised black-and-white and colour images in letterpress. From rasterised zinc stereotypes, a wax mould was made and coated with a thin galvanic copper layer. This galvanisation was filled with type metal, producing a highly detailed replica of the original stereotype, often used for high-quality prints.

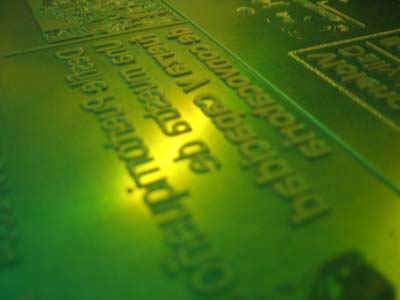
Flexographic forme with raised relief

Since the 1970s, letterpress has been largely supplanted by the more cost-effective offset printing.

=== Flexography ===
In flexography, soft formes and low-viscosity inks are used, making it ideal for printing on non-porous materials like aluminum foil and polyethylene. The formes are made from either UV-sensitive photopolymer or rubber. Photopolymer formes are exposed to UV light through a negative mask, with printing elements developed through a washing process. Rubber formes are created using laser engraving. After production, the formes are mounted or adhered to the printing cylinder of the flexographic press.

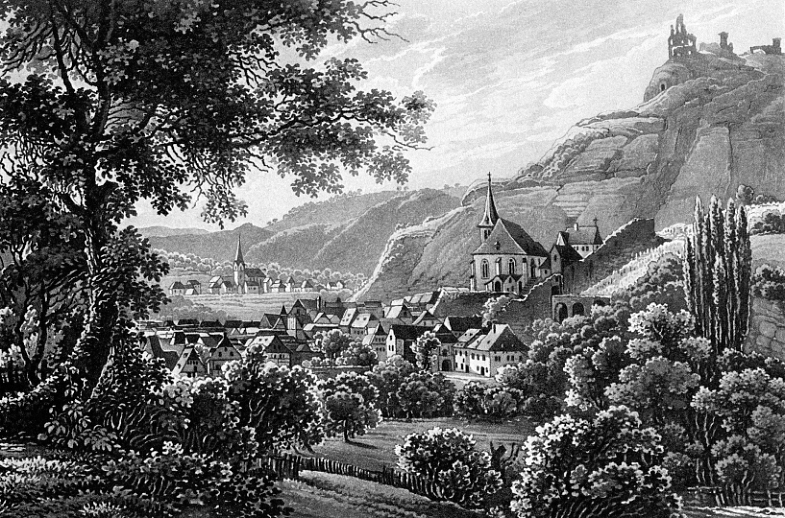
Aquatint by Karl Bodmer, 1841, depicting Traben-Trarbach and Grevenburg on the Mosel

== Intaglio printing ==
In intaglio printing, the printing areas are recessed below the non-printing surfaces, which remain at a consistent level. The entire forme is flooded with ink before printing, and excess ink is removed with a doctor blade. Ink is transferred to the paper under high pressure. Intaglio includes commercial rotogravure and artistic techniques such as etching, aquatint, copperplate engraving, and steel engraving.

=== Rotogravure ===
In rotogravure, the forme is a heavy steel cylinder coated with a thin layer of galvanically applied copper. The print image is chemically etched or electronically engraved into this copper layer as tiny cells. The surface is then chrome-plated to enhance durability for high-volume printing. After printing, the copper layer is stripped for cylinder reuse.

Gravure distinguishes between conventional variable-depth and modern variable-depth-and-area methods. In the conventional method, cells are of uniform size but vary in depth. A positive film of the print image is copied onto evenly rasterised pigment paper, coated with gelatine and pigments made light-sensitive with potassium dichromate. After exposure and development, a gelatine relief is transferred to the cylinder, and the image is etched in a multi-stage process. However, conventional gravure has lost prominence due to challenges in standardising forme production. The modern variable-depth-and-area method, created electronically, has become standard.

Diamond stylus engraving has been largely replaced by faster, more precise laser engraving, which optimises cell shapes, enabling frequency-modulated halftones and smooth edges without jagged effects.

== Planographic printing ==
In planographic printing, printing and non-printing areas lie on the same plane. The process relies on the chemical repulsion between oil and water: printing areas are oleophilic (ink-attracting), while non-printing areas are coated with a water film that repels oily ink. This category includes lithography, offset printing, and collotype.

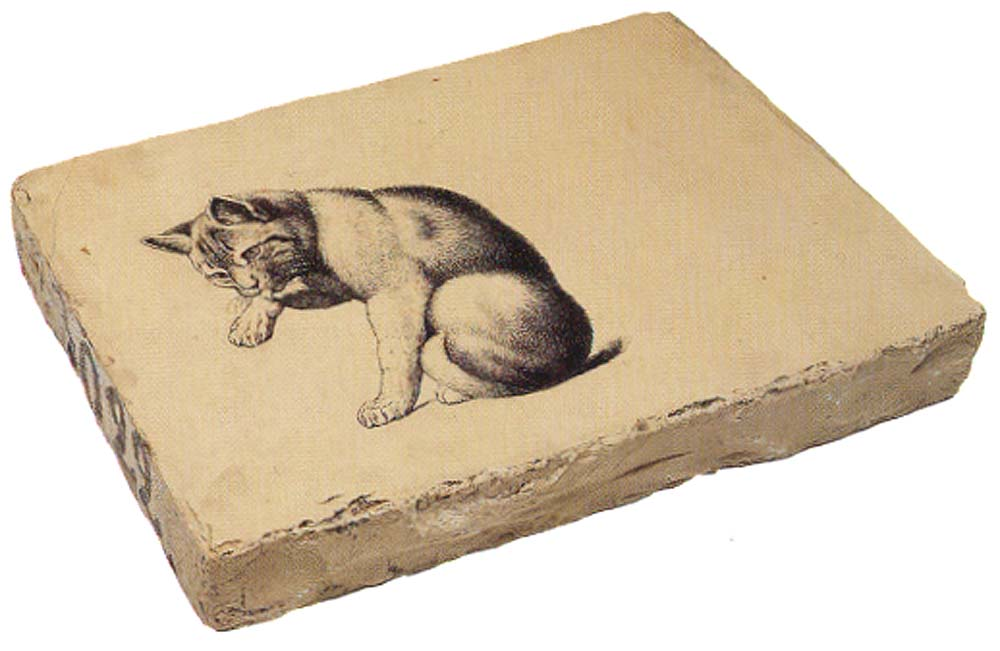
Lithographic stone with the logo of Hoffmann's Starch

=== Lithography ===
Invented in 1798 by Alois Senefelder, lithography was the only 19th-century printing method capable of producing large runs of colour prints. The forme was a limestone slab, typically sourced from Solnhofen in Bavaria. The design was applied to the stone with ink or chalk by the lithographer and transferred to paper in a lithographic press. The stone required chemical preparation, known as etching, to enhance the oleophilic properties of the printing areas while making non-printing areas water-absorbent and ink-repellent. The etching solution, a mix of nitric acid, gum arabic, and water, required significant expertise to optimise the stone’s printing properties. Today, artists often commission experienced lithographers to prepare their stones to ensure quality.

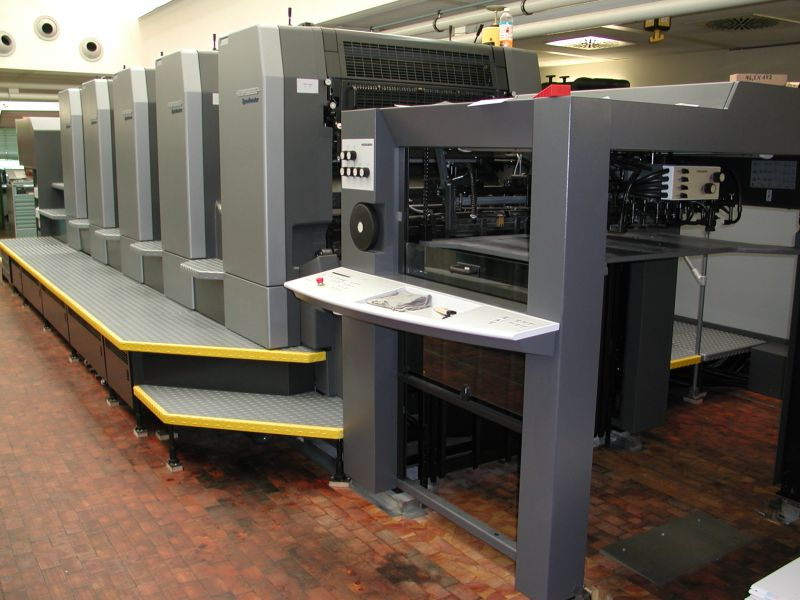
Sheet-fed offset press with five printing units – HEIDELBERG Speedmaster CD 102

Lithography was widely used for various printed materials until the 1930s but was gradually replaced by offset printing. It is now primarily used for artistic purposes, as it is uneconomical for modern mass production compared to other printing techniques.

=== Offset printing ===
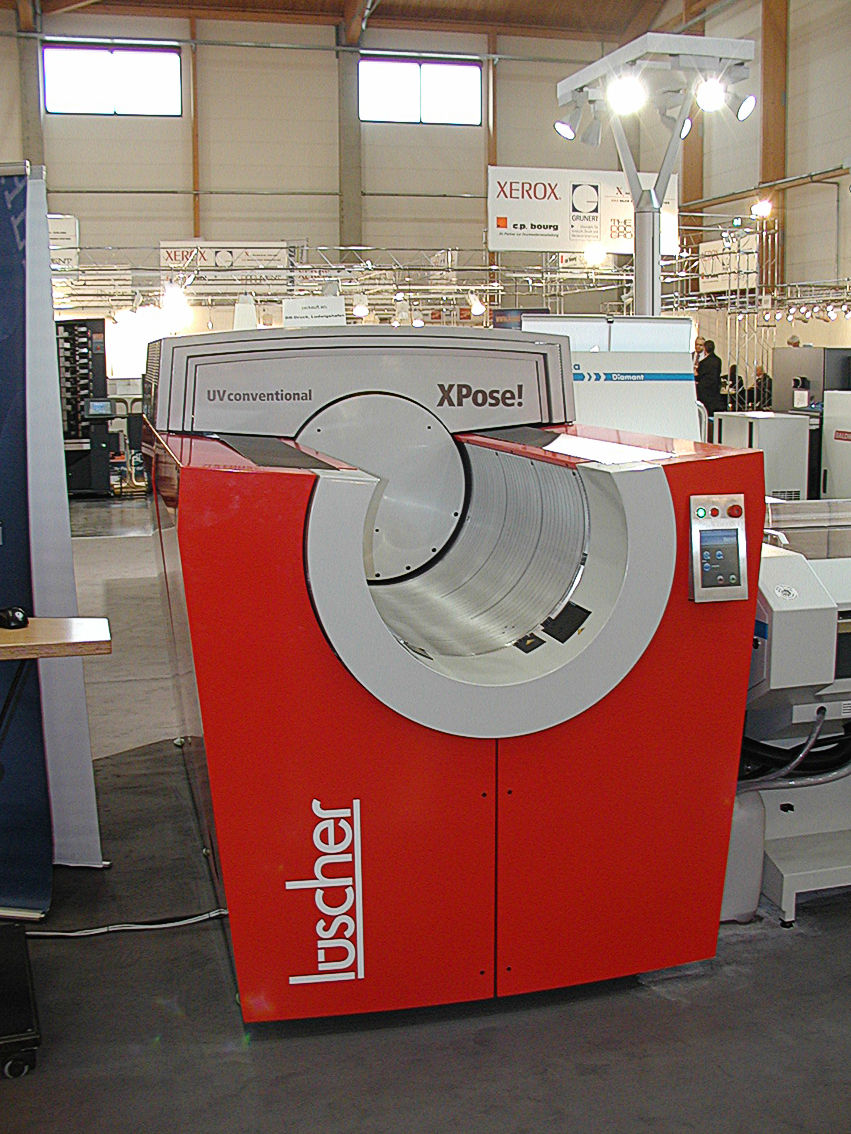
XPose – Forme imaging device by Lüscher

In the early 20th century, offset printing developed from lithography. The process involves transferring the image from a thin metal forme to a rubber blanket, then to paper. The flexible rubber blanket adapts to the surface texture of the substrate, enabling printing on rough papers. Formes were initially made of zinc, later transitioning to multi-metal and aluminium formes.

The print image is transferred to the forme from reversed positive films onto a light-sensitive coating. Exposure under a copying lamp breaks down the coating, and soluble exposed areas are washed away during development, leaving a right-reading print image that requires optimisation, similar to lithography.

Traditional copying has largely been replaced by computer to-plate (CTP) technology, where formes are imaged directly from digital data, bypassing film. Development occurs either within the imaging device or in a separate machine. Since 2008, direct imaging has emerged, where formes are imaged directly in the press, eliminating manual forme handling and reducing setup times. However, this method has not yet gained widespread adoption, as modern presses have optimised forme changes to allow new prints to start within minutes.

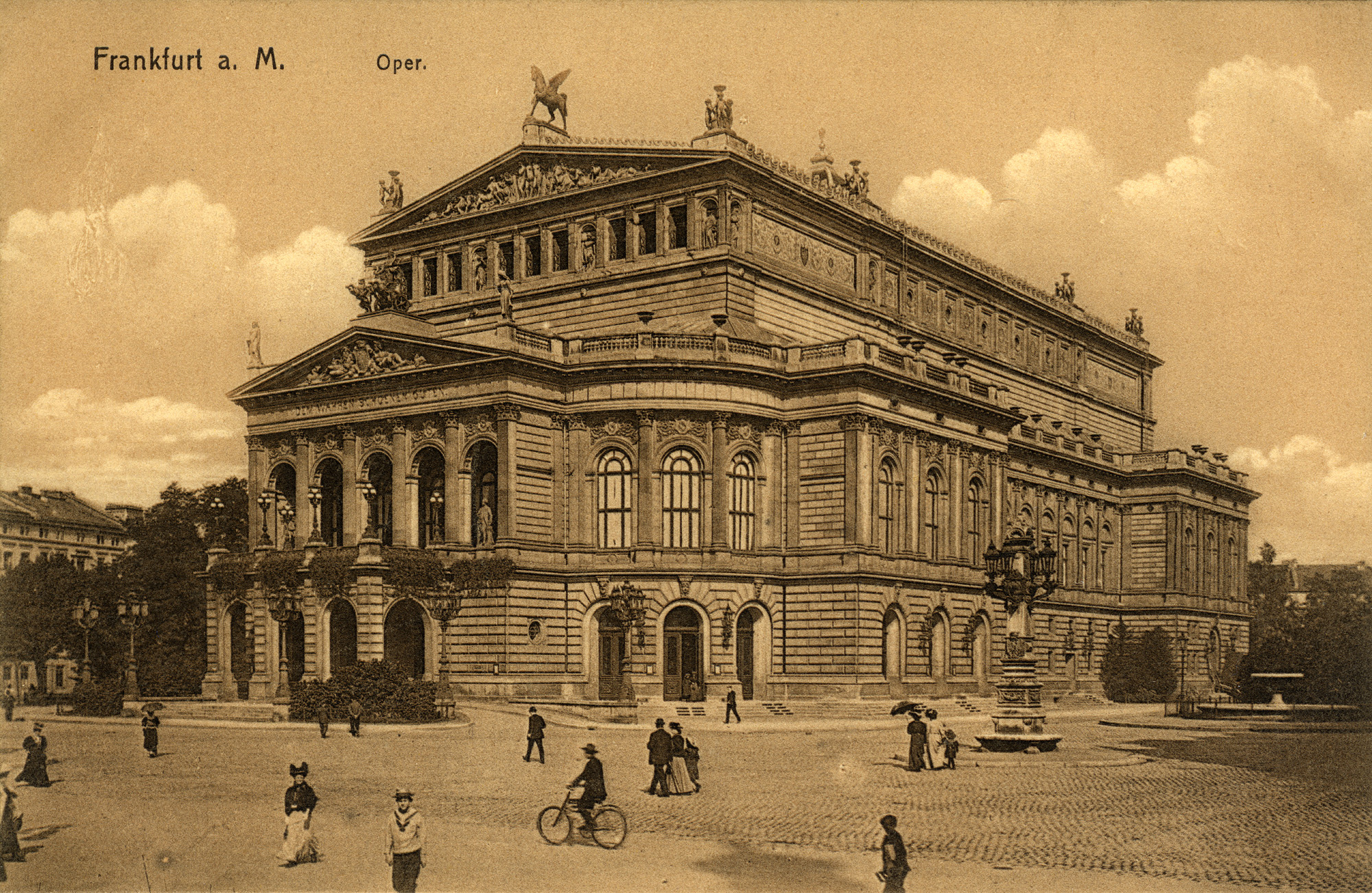
Collotype postcard, circa 1900

=== Collotype ===
Collotype is now used exclusively for artistic prints with very small runs. The forme is a 10 mm-thick frosted glass plate coated with a light-sensitive chromated gelatine emulsion. A photographic halftone negative, typically a colour separation, is copied onto the forme under UV light. Exposure alters the water solubility of the gelatine, forming a gelatine relief. This process, called tanning, creates a wrinkle grain instead of a conventional raster. After exposure, the forme is immersed in cold water (5–10°C) to wash out chromates, preventing further exposure.

For colour reproductions, a separate forme is made for each colour separation. For facsimile prints of artworks, up to 20 formes may be used, layered to achieve exceptional fidelity to the original.

Schematic of screen printing: Ink (A), Doctor blade (B), Open mesh/Print pattern (C), Screen (D), Frame (E), Substrate (F)

== Stencilling ==
The most well-known stencil printing method is screen printing (or serigraphy), where ink is forced through a fine mesh onto the substrate using a wiper-like tool called a rubber doctor blade.

=== Screen printing ===
The forme in screen printing consists of a frame stretched with a metal or plastic mesh. The stencil, which carries the print image, is affixed to the mesh. For simple, solid-area prints, manually created stencils are attached to the underside of the screen. For rasterised or multi-colour prints, a light-sensitive photopolymer coating is used. After coating and drying, a right-reading positive of the print image is exposed onto the screen under UV light. The light hardens transparent areas, while image areas remain soluble and are washed out with water during development. Imperfections can be corrected with a screen filler.

Screen printing is primarily used in advertising, labelling, textile and ceramic printing, and industrial applications.

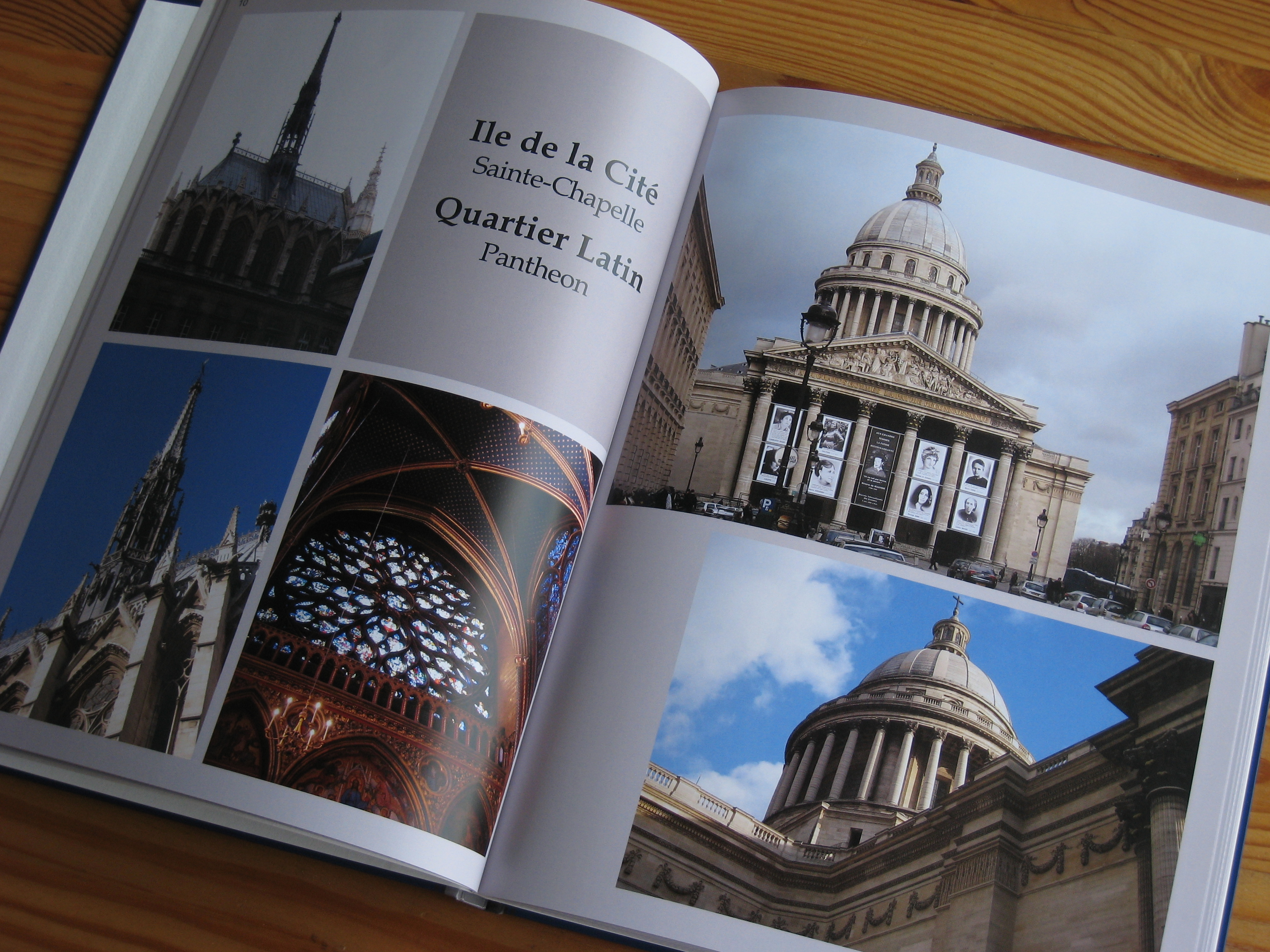
Photobook

== Digital printing ==
Conventional printing methods rely on a static forme that transfers the same image with each impression. Producing these formes and the associated setup times in the press incur high costs, requiring long print runs and high volumes for cost-effectiveness. For small print runs, digital printing methods, which operate without physical formes and are driven directly by computer data, are more suitable. These include xerography, thermal transfer printing, and inkjet printing, collectively known as digital printing or NIP processes. Common applications include print on demand, photobooks, and personalised items such as invitations, wedding announcements, thank-you notes, and business cards.

== See also ==
- History of western typography
- Typography
- Oshigata
