= Quoin (printing) =

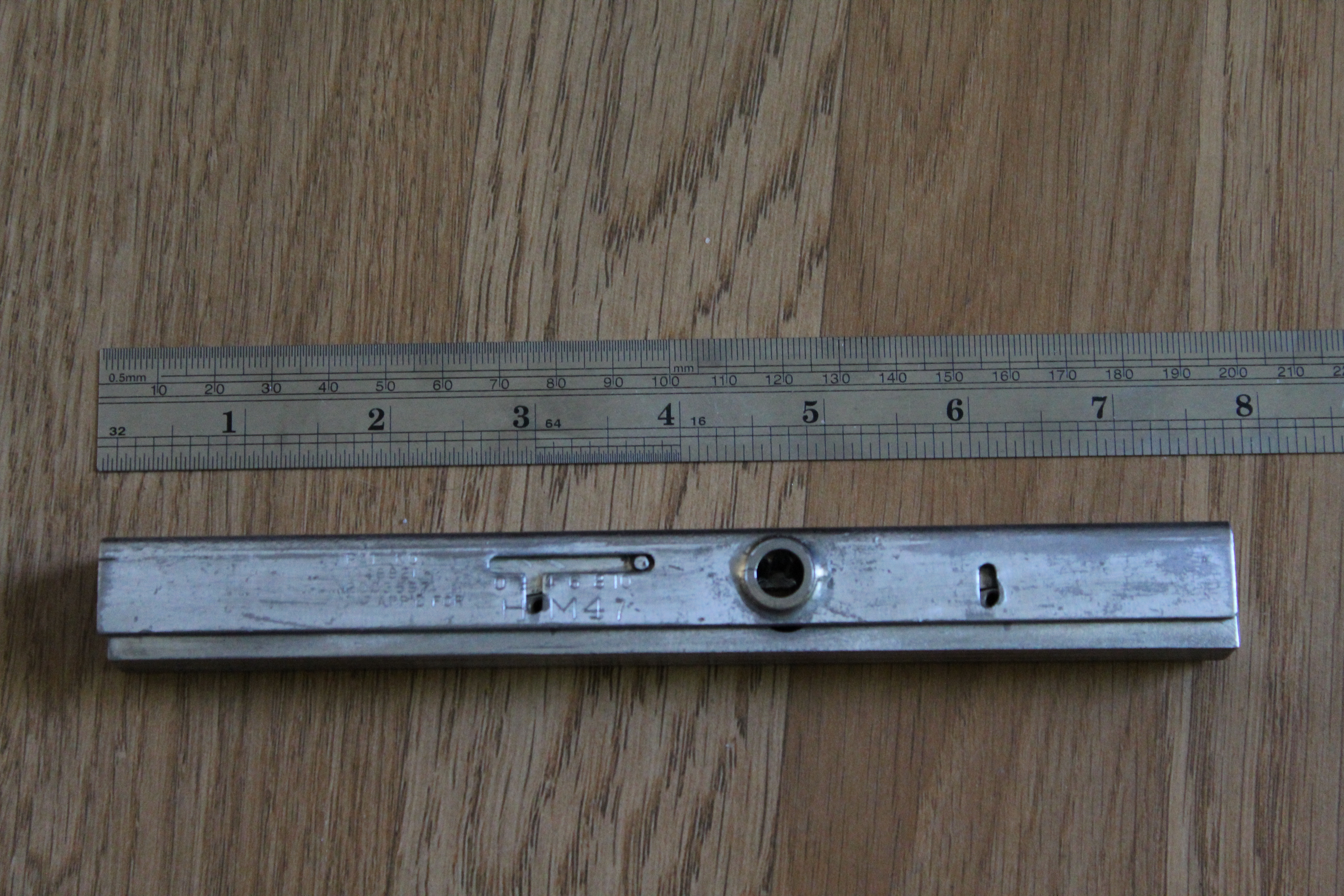
Top view of a Challenge Hi-Speed Quoin, model H M47, by The Challenge Mchry Co, Grand Haven, Michigan, U.S. The hole to the right of center is for a quoin key. The quoin is about 190 mm (7.5 in) long, and 18 mm (0.7 in) tall. The width expands by about 10 points, from 17 mm (0.68 in) to 21 mm (0.82 in) as the quoin key is turned clockwise.

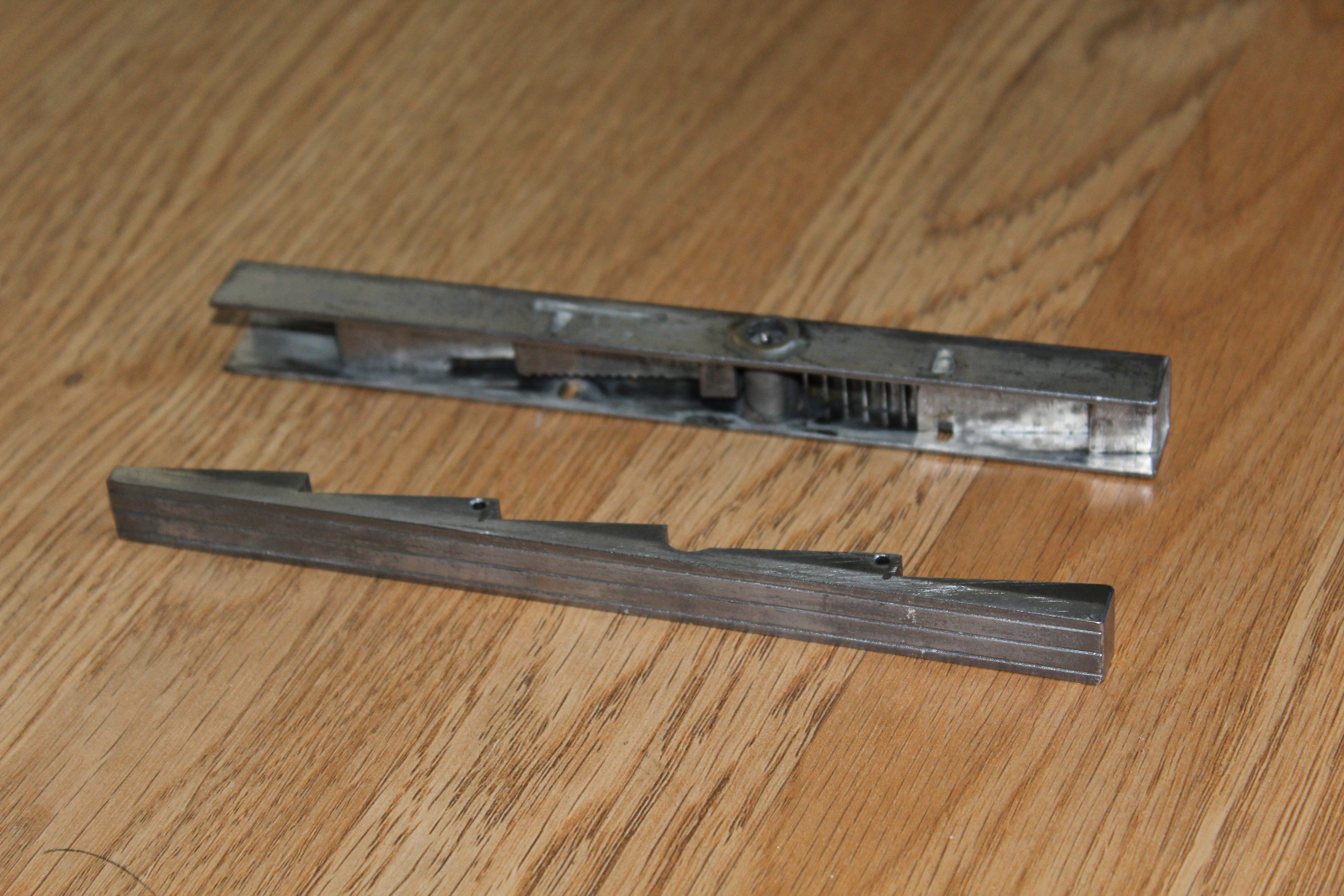
View of the parts of a disassembled Challenge Hi-Speed Quoin. The five wedges on the part in the foreground remain fixed, while five corresponding wedges in the background part slide when a quoin key (not shown) is inserted and turned. As the corresponding wedges move against each other, the quoin expands.

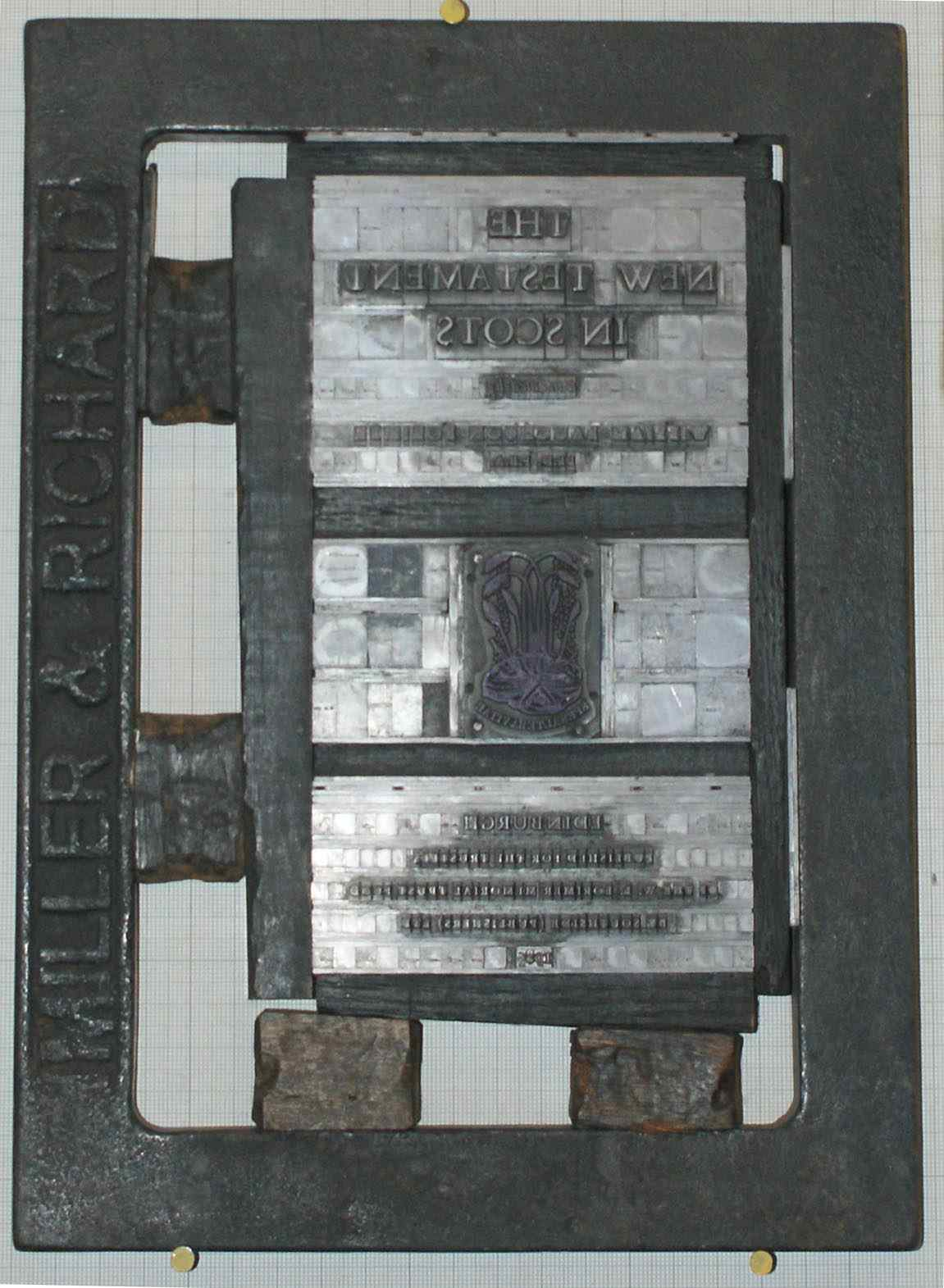
A single-page "forme" for printing the front page of the New Testament of the Christian Bible. The black frame surrounding it is the "chase", and the two objects each on the bottom and left side are the "quoins".

A quoin is a device used to lock printing type in a chase in letterpress printing. Quoins are pairs of wedges, facing opposite directions. A wrench or quoin key forces them together.
