= Vandercook =

Vandercook & Sons
- Type: Private
- Industry: Printing
- Founded: Chicago, Illinois (September 1909)
- Founder: Robert Vandercook
- Successor: NA Graphics
- Headquarters: Chicago, Illinois, United States
- Products: Printing presses

Vandercook & Sons was a manufacturer of proof presses, founded in 1909 by Robert Vandercook. They dominated the 20th-century proof press industry by developing the first and most widely used proof presses that did not rely on gravity for the force of their impression. As a result, Vandercook's geared presses were easier and more precise for operators to use.

Vandercook was sold in 1968 to the Illinois Tool Works, when it became Vandersons. The company changed hands many times and is now called NA Graphics, a letterpress supply house, located in Silverton, Colorado.

== History ==
In September 1909, Robert Vandercook founded Vandercook & Sons in Chicago, Illinois. The first press was a "rocker" proof press, made with a geared cylinder. Before the development of this press, all proofs were either made on a roller press, which depended on gravity for impression, or on a Washington Hand Press.

Logo from 1968, right after being purchased by Illinois Tool Works.

During the next 54 years, the company introduced 60 different press models. Over the course of its 75-year production history, Vandercook manufactured more than 38,000 presses under its brand name. The name of Vandercook & Sons was used until 1968 when E.O. Vandercook sold the company to one of its suppliers, Illinois Tool Works (ITW). ITW only kept the company for four years and then sold it to one of their managers, Hugh Fletcher, who renamed the company Vandersons Corporation. Vandersons stopped manufacturing presses in 1976 at which time it only made models HS27, SP20, SP25 and Universal I. After ceasing to manufacture presses, Vandersons continued selling parts and supplies for the thousands of presses that were still being used. In 1989 the company was sold to Stuart Evans.

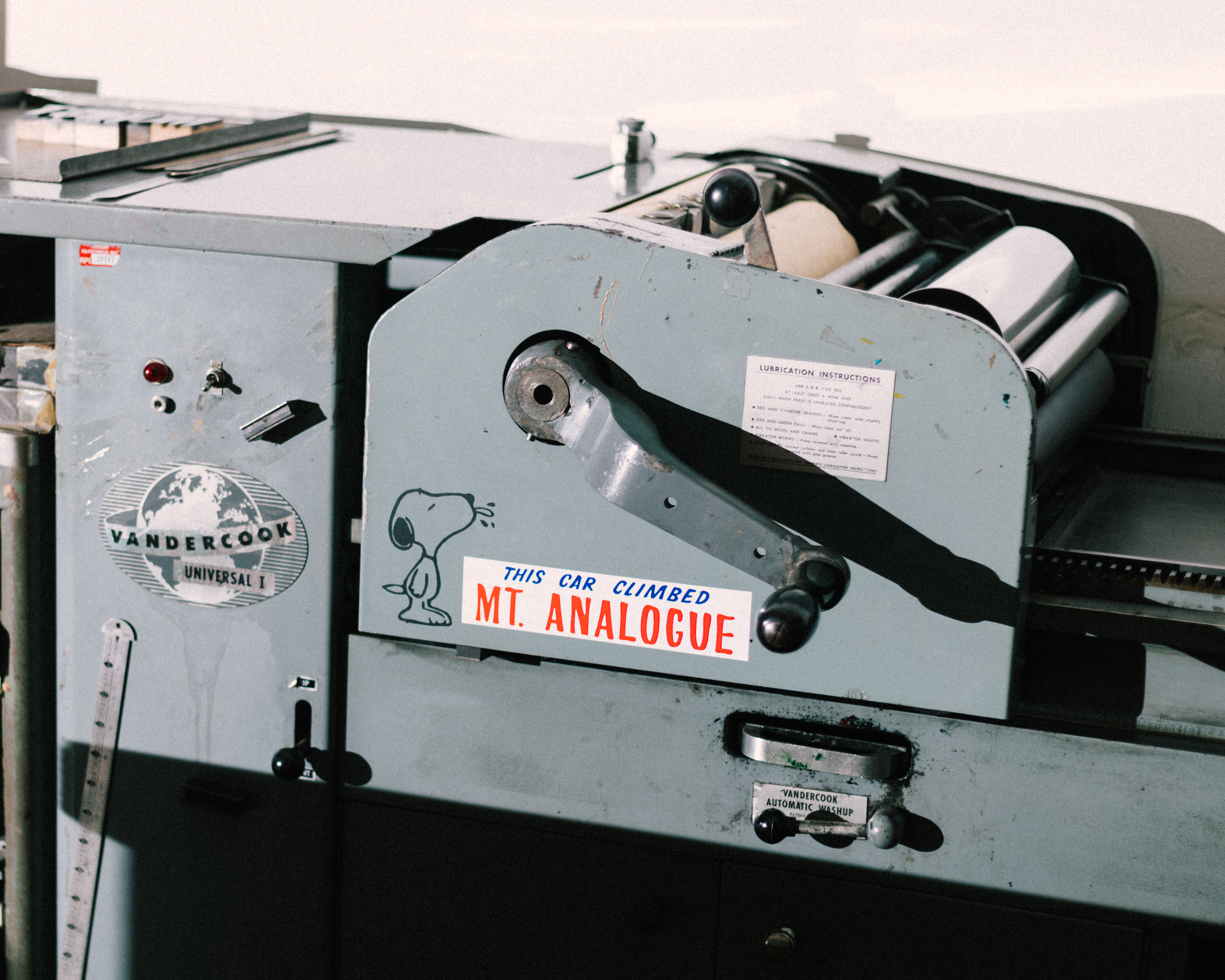
A Vandercook Universal I located in The Arm, a letterpress shop in Brooklyn, New York.

In January 1994, Tom Bell and Hal Sterne of NA Graphics bought the company and moved it to Cincinnati, Ohio. Then in October 1996, they sold NA Graphics to Fritz Klinke, who moved the operation to Silverton, Colorado. NA Graphics is still selling parts and supplies for many models of Vandercook presses.

== Press models ==
Before World War II, Vandercook developed 29 models, 17 of which were still being manufactured many years after the war. The most popular of these models was Model 4, which was first made in 1935 and not discontinued until 1960. Many are still in use today. In 1948, they brought out the model 4T, which was used to pull transparency proofs of type on acetate. The acetate proofs could then be contacted to film for offset negatives. During World War II, not many presses were made because Vandercook was heavily involved in manufacturing for the war effort, for which they received the E award. One press they made for the government during the war was a model 055, 51″ x 75″ in size.

With the exception of models 0, 01, 03, and 099, which were gravity-type presses, all of the Vandercooks had geared cylinders. The last models designed were the SP series (which stands for Simple Precision) and the Universal series. They are similar in design, but the Universal presses were originally designed as test presses for ink companies and paper mills. Most of them were made with automatic controls and adjustable beds (AB). The SP series consisted mostly of hand presses. The SP15 was the most popular of them all.

Besides letterpress proof presses, Vandercook also made offset proof presses. The flatbed presses were the model 20-26 (wet) and 15-20 (dry). In 1968, they came out with the model RO4-29. This unique four-color model was an offset proofing press that featured a common impression cylinder surrounded by four printing units. This press was capable of running 1,500 sheets per hour and automatically producing progressive proofs. They also made four-color letterpress wet proof presses: Model 604, which was brought out in 1947, and 10 years later replaced by Model 30-26, which was made until 1972.

Prices for the early model rocker presses ranged from US$140 to $175, depending on the size. Forty years later, the Model 0 proof press was still only $175. Other prices in 1955 included $1,965 for a Model 4 and $23,650 for a model 604. In 1958, The Universal I cost $2,150.
