= Offset ink =

Type of ink used with offset printing presse

Offset ink is a specific type of printing ink used in offset printing, a commercial printing process. Such ink must be specially formulated to resist other chemicals it will come in contact with on the printing press, because the process relies on surface tension. It is widely used for printing high-quality images and text on paper, cardboard, and certain plastics.

Offset ink must resist water-in-ink emulsification (i.e., repel rather than absorb water). It needs to have specific physical and chemical properties to work correctly with the dampening solution (also called fount solution) or silicone coating that covers the non-printing areas of the engraved plate. Offset ink needs to be very rich in pigment so that its full color vibrancy is perceptible, even in minute quantity.

Offset ink consists of powdered pigments (organic or inorganic), binders (also called varnish in the trade), additives, and mineral oil as a carrier.
