= Chase (printing) =

(metal) frame that is used to contain a printing forme

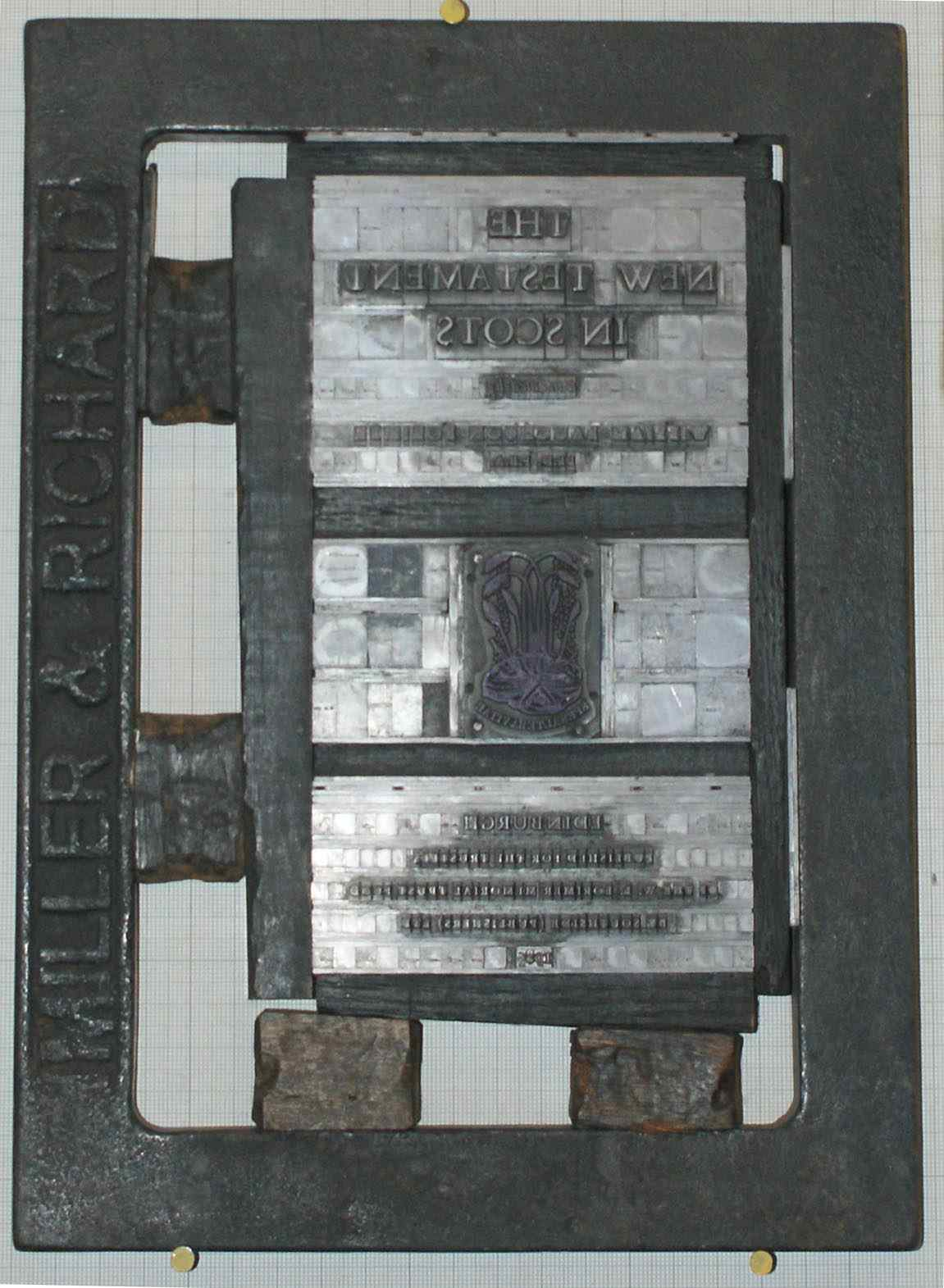
A single-page "forme" for printing the front page of the New Testament of the Christian Bible. The black frame surrounding it is the "chase"; the pieces of wood are the "furniture", and the two objects each on the bottom and left side are the "quoins".

A chase is a heavy steel frame used to hold type in a letterpress. Most of the space in the chase not occupied with type is filled with blocks of wood called furniture. The type and furniture are locked in place by quoins. When a chase is locked up with type, furniture, and quoins, it is called a forme.
