= Furniture (typesetting) =

Pieces of wood used in typesetting

In typesetting, furniture is a term for pieces of wood that are shorter than the height of the type. These pieces are used to lay out type by blocking out empty spaces (white space) in a layout set in a chase. Furniture can be made of wood or metal and is of varying lengths and sizes.

The term furniture or page furniture is also used to refer to items on a page other than the main text and images, such as headlines, bylines or image captions.
