= JLT =

JLT may refer to:

== Business ==
- Jardine Lloyd Thompson, a British corporation
- Jewish Life Television
- Jumeirah Lakes Towers, a DMCC development in Dubai, United Arab Emirates
  - Jumeirah Lakes Towers (Dubai Metro)

== Music ==
- Joe Lynn Turner (born 1951), American singer
  - JLT (album), an album by Joe Lynn Turner
- JLT (John Lindberg Trio), a Swedish band

== Publications ==
- Journal of Lightwave Technology
- Journal of Literary Theory

== Other uses ==
- JLT-Condor, a British cycling team
- Jump if less than, a branch instruction in computer programming
- 2017 JLT Community Series, Australian rules football competition

== See also ==
- Mariategui JLT, Peruvian insurance brokerage company
