= Jobbing press =

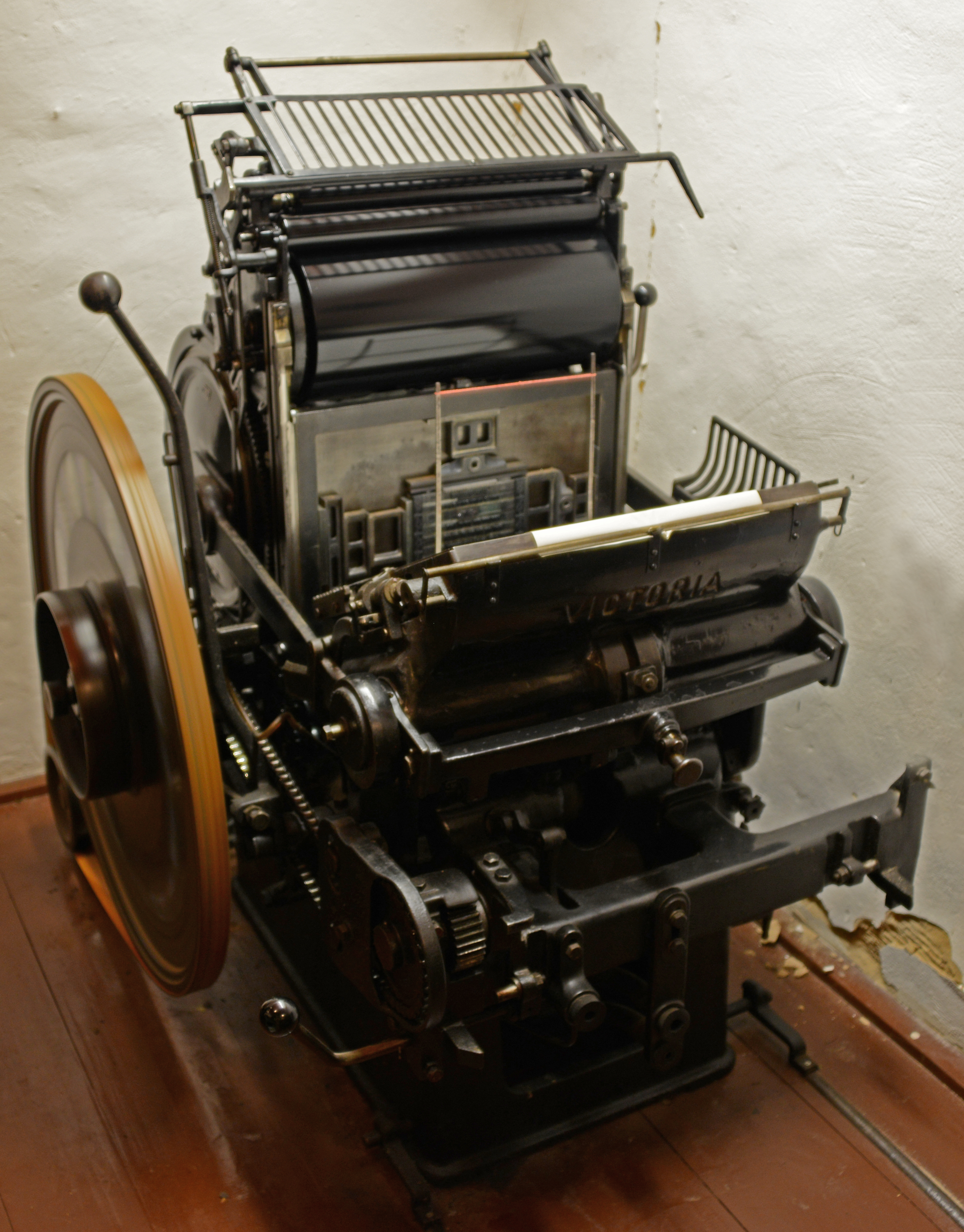
A platen jobbing press in operation

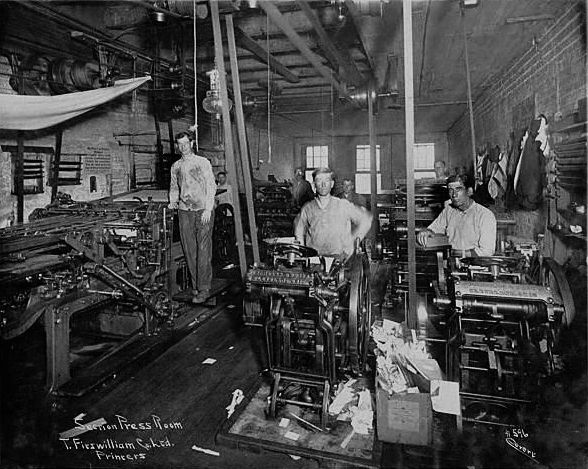
A press room (ca. 1917) with several platen jobbing machines hooked up to line shaft; a cylinder press is at left.

A jobbing press, job press, or jobber is a variety of printing press used in letterpress printing.

The press is meant to be operated by a pressman working on small jobs, as opposed to long print runs or newspaper work, or jobs that require less than a full-sized sheet of paper, though the definition of "small jobs" may vary widely depending on the printing shop. Such work might include printing personal stationery, handbills, or other small printing jobs, or may include even a small book. Such presses were common in the later 19th and 20th centuries, have yet been largely replaced by the photocopier for small and medium runs and by the desktop computer for personal stationery. Today, the jobber is the preferred press for letterpress printers who now produce high-end prints (often wedding invitations) for customers who want an antique effect.

Though the term can refer to any small printing press or machine intended for such work, it most commonly refers to a class of small, vertical platen presses. Depending on the time period when the machine was made, they may be operated by treadle, line shaft, electricity, or by hand lever.

== Platen job press ==
The most common form of job presses were those classified as platen presses. A platen press is one that has a platen (a flat metal plate) to apply the needed pressure against the paper and bed of type to form the impression, in contrast to those presses that use a cylinder.

George Phineas Gordon developed a design of press that was widely adopted, his "Franklin Press". Chandler & Price was a company that made a widely used jobber press.

== See also ==
- Adana Printing Machines
- Golding Pearl
