= Brandtjen and Kluge =

- Type: Family owned
- Industry: Graphic Arts Equipment
- Founded: St. Paul, Minnesota, United States, 1919
- Founder: John Brandtjen, Henry Brandtjen Sr., Abel Kluge, and Eneval Kluge
- Headquarters: St. Croix Falls, Wisconsin, United States
- Key people: Henry Brandtjen Jr.
- Website: http://www.kluge.biz/

Brandtjen and Kluge is a US manufacturer of platen foil stamping, embossing & diecutting presses along with modular folder-gluers. Together John and Henry Brandtjen and the Kluge brothers developed the world's first successful automatic feeder for open platen (Gordon) printing presses (such as those manufactured by Chandler & Price), and in November 1919, Brandtjen & Kluge was formed in St. Paul, Minnesota to manufacture and sell the feeder. Brandtjen & Kluge is currently located in St. Croix Falls, Wisconsin.
