= Printing press =

Device to apply ink under pressure

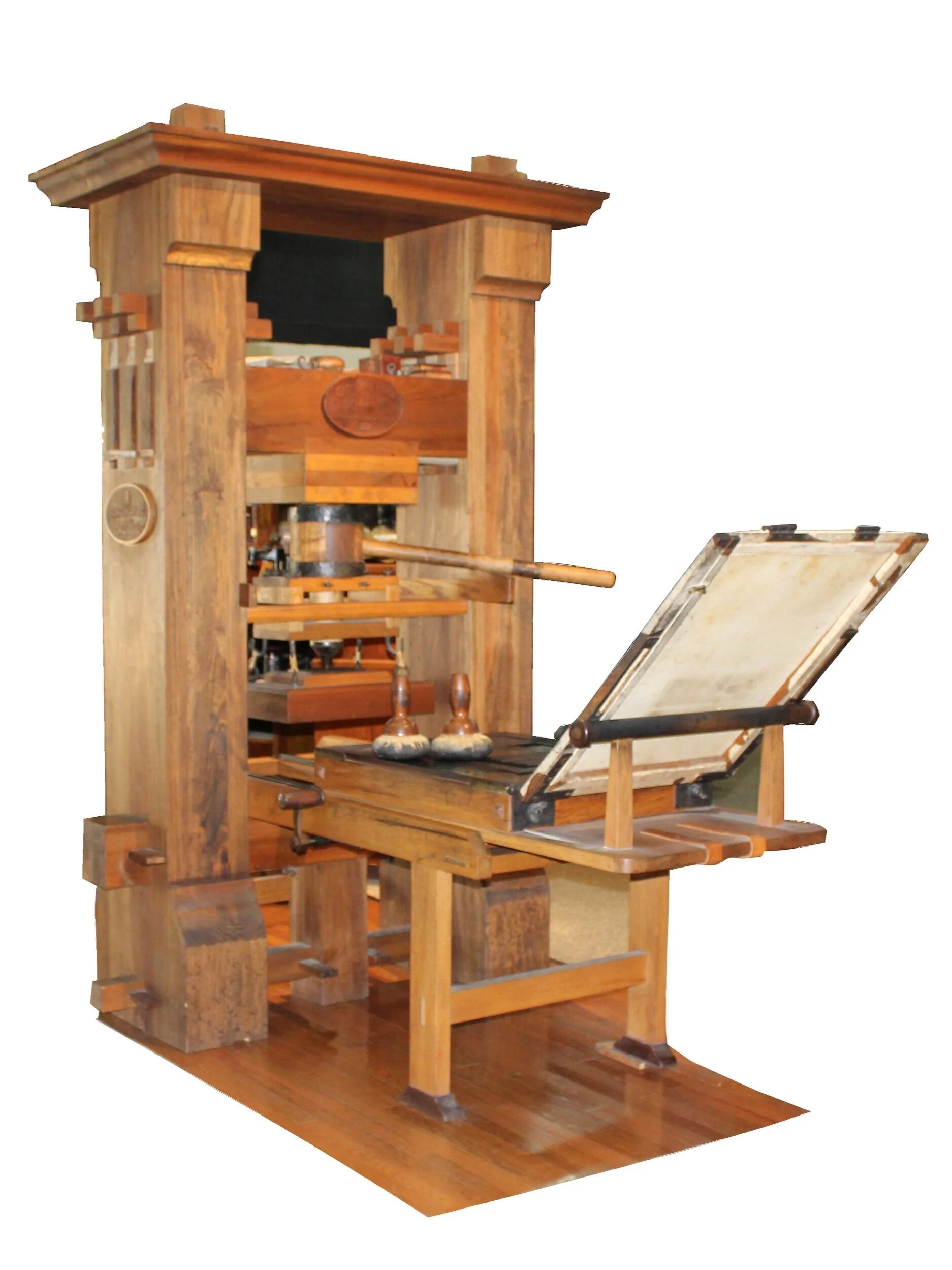
- A recreated Gutenberg press at the International Printing Museum in Carson, California
- Classification: Machine
- Application: Printing
- Inventor: Johannes Gutenberg
- Invented: c. 1440

A printing press is a machine that applies pressure to transfer ink onto a surface made of paper, cloth, or a similar material. Its workers are known as printing press operators. It marked a significant improvement on earlier methods, in which the paper was rubbed by hand to transfer applied ink to the printing surface.

The printing press was invented by the German goldsmith Johannes Gutenberg around 1440, and its subsequent global spread revolutionized literary production and communication during the early modern period. The spread of printing brought about an era of mass communication in European society, allowing information to quickly spread across Europe and contributing to the Reformation and the Scientific Revolution. The cost of printed texts declined and their availability increased, facilitating higher adult literacy rates across Europe. Books increasingly appeared in vernacular languages rather than Latin, and national languages were standardized.

The basic design of the wooden handpress was largely consistent for over three centuries, until the Industrial Revolution. By 1800 Lord Stanhope had built a new iron printing press printing a sheet at one pull. In 1814, The Times adopted Friedrich Koenig's new presses, which incorporated steam power and rotary motion. Richard M. Hoe's rotary printing press, introduced in 1843, enabled much higher output; later rotary presses could produce millions of page impressions in a day. During the twentieth century, the letterpress was largely replaced by offset printing, phototypesetting, and digital printing in commercial work.

== History ==
Johannes Gutenberg invented the movable-type printing press around 1440, utilizing four existing technologies: the screw press, movable type, the codex book format, and mechanized paper production. The economic and cultural changes of late medieval Europe brought about viable commercial conditions for his press. The urban middle class grew alongside trade and commerce, while the growing number of universities since the twelfth century had increased demand for books. Hand-copying was slow and expensive, and by the fifteenth century, the supply of manuscripts was much less than the demand. Gutenberg integrated these four technologies into a single working system and added a number of innovations of his own, including a hand mold for casting type and an oil-based ink suited to metal type.

=== Technological factors ===
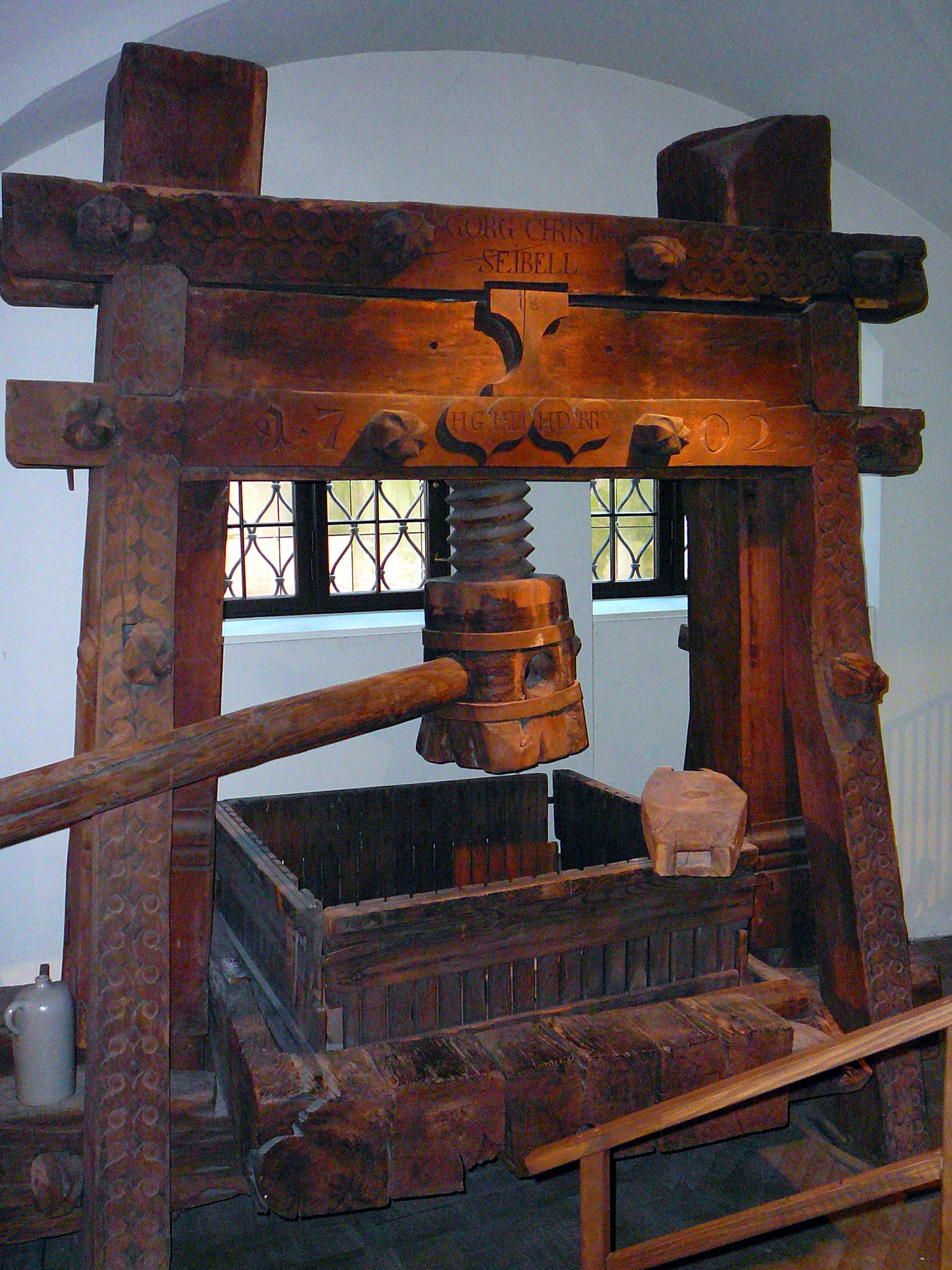
Early modern wine press. Such screw presses, used in Europe for a wide range of uses, provided Gutenberg with the model for his printing press.

The first factor, the screw press, permitted direct pressure to be applied on a flat plane. Used for a variety of tasks and introduced by the Romans in the 1st century AD, it was often used by farmers for pressing grapes to make wine and olives to make oil. Gutenberg may also have been inspired by the paper presses which operated similarly to the screw press and were used across the German lands from the late 14th century. He adopted the basic design of the screw press, thereby mechanizing the printing process. Printing brought the machine different demands, and Gutenberg adapted the construction so that the platen (a flat surface) exerted even pressure across the paper with minimal smearing. Gutenberg introduced a movable undertable with a level surface on which the sheets could be swiftly changed.

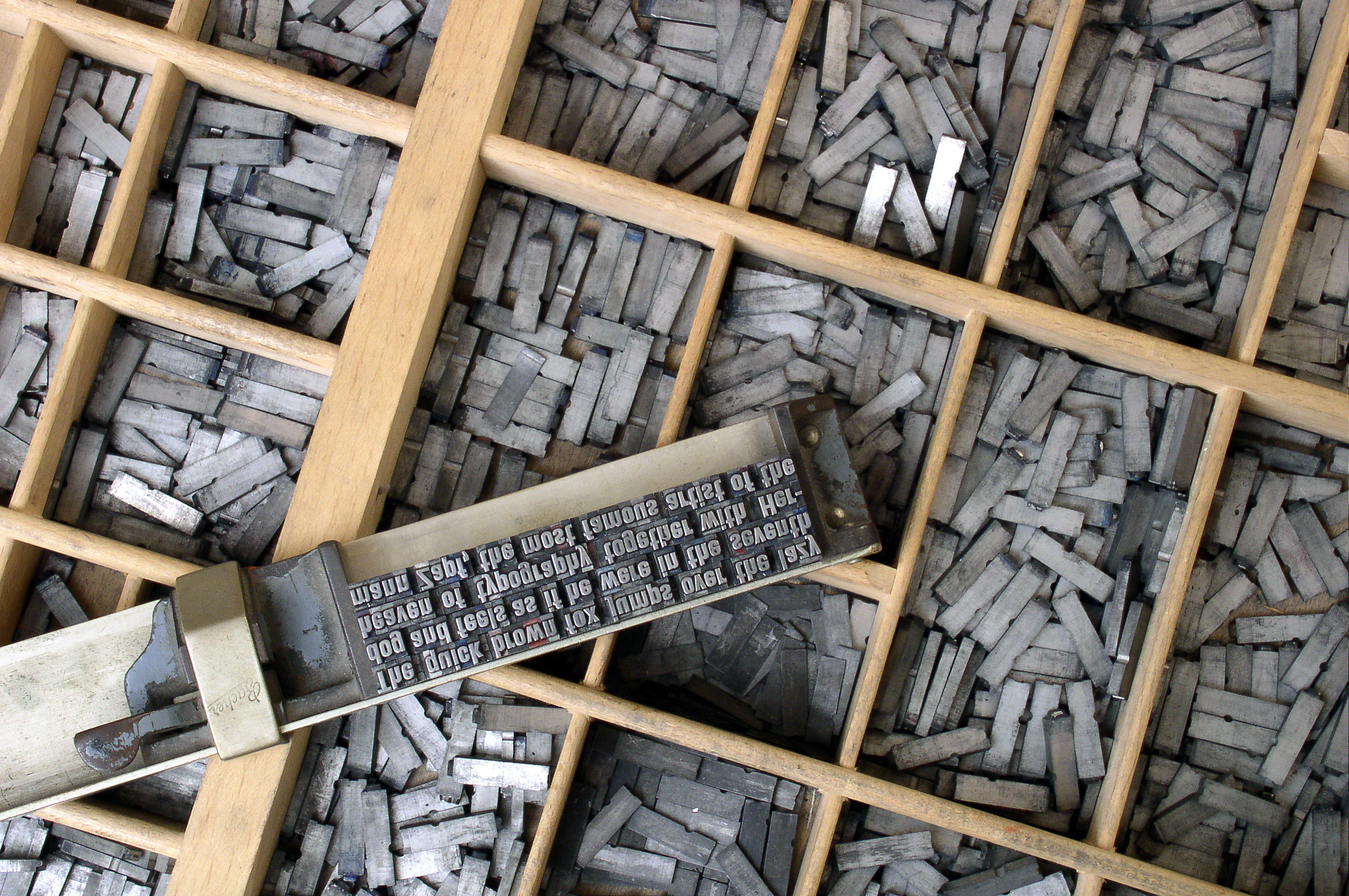
Movable type sorted in a letter case and loaded in a composing stick on top

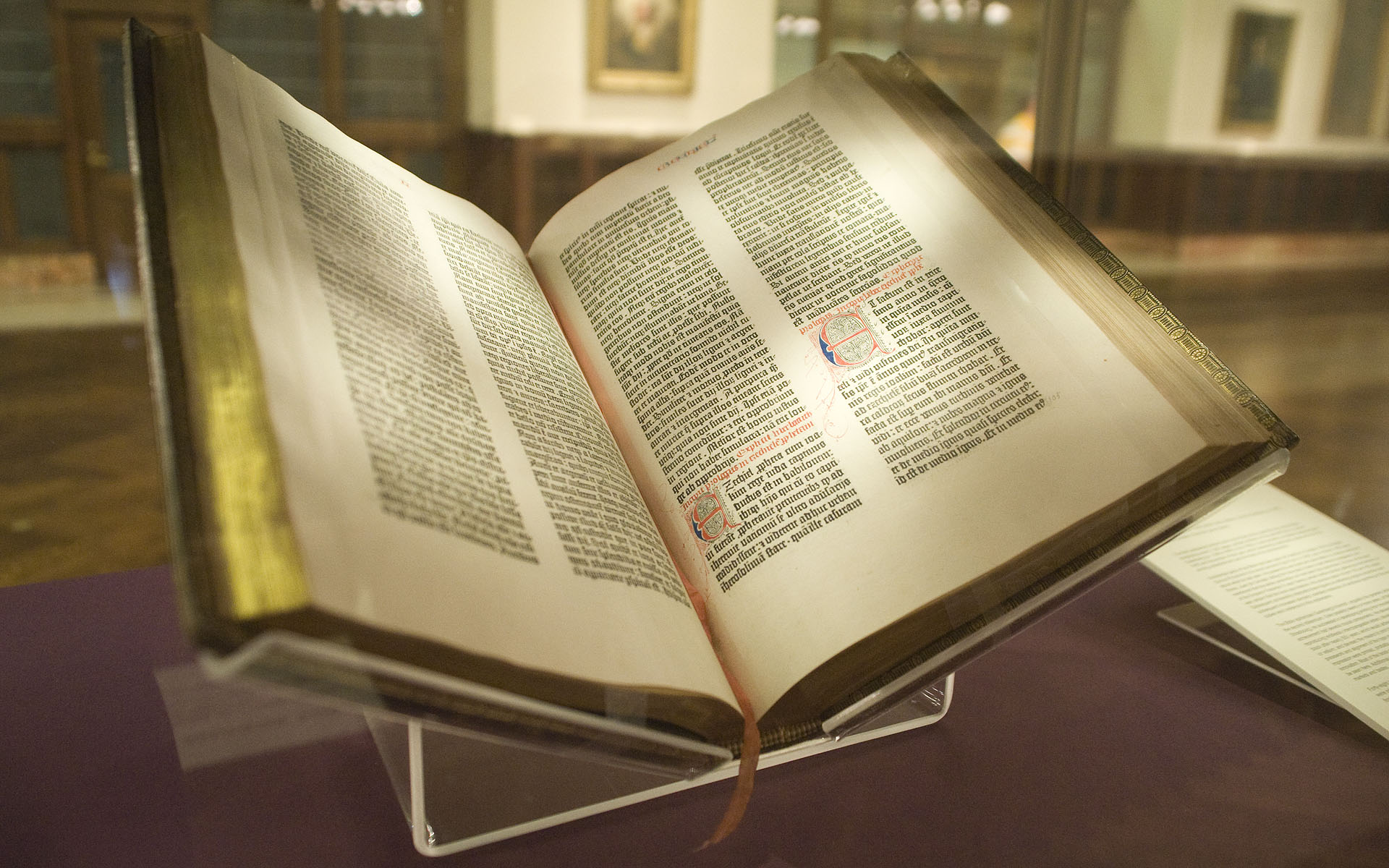
A paper codex of the 42-line Bible, Gutenberg's major work

Movable type is the typographical principle of writing a text from individual reusable characters. The Chinese artisan Bi Sheng invented the first movable type in the 11th century during the Song dynasty, using characters made of baked clay. Around 1300, Wang Zhen developed a set of movable wooden type, arranged on revolving tables, which he used to print a local gazetteer. Wang wrote about his invention in his agricultural treatise. Woodblock printing remained the primary method in East Asia. The oldest surviving book incorporating metal movable type is the Jikji dating to 1377, produced under the Korean state of Goryeo. However, none of the various East Asian methods gained widespread usage, largely due to their relative inefficiency. The logographic script used in China included thousands of distinct characters, resulting in high production costs for a full set of type. The Gutenberg press benefited from its use of the Latin alphabet with a relatively small set of characters.

The codex book format also dated to the Roman Empire, and was of utmost significance in the history of the book. By 500 AD, Christian and Muslim scribes had shifted from using scrolls to using codices. The codex proved more convenient than the scroll format because of its greater legibility, compact arrangement, lower costs, and the availability of both left and right pages.

Medieval papermakers had successfully mechanized the production of paper. Water-powered paper mills were in usage by 1282, resulting in much greater production and replacing the tedious processes associated with Chinese and Muslim papermaking. The number of papermaking centers grew rapidly in late 13th-century Italy, causing paper to become much cheaper than parchment. These centers became more common in Germany a century later.

However, the increased usage of paper was just as dependent on the rise of movable-type printing. Codices of parchment are superior in quality to any other writing material, and Gutenberg still made great use of them in his edition of the 42-line Bible. After much experimentation, he concluded that the formula for an oil-based ink worked best for printing with metal type.

=== Gutenberg's press ===
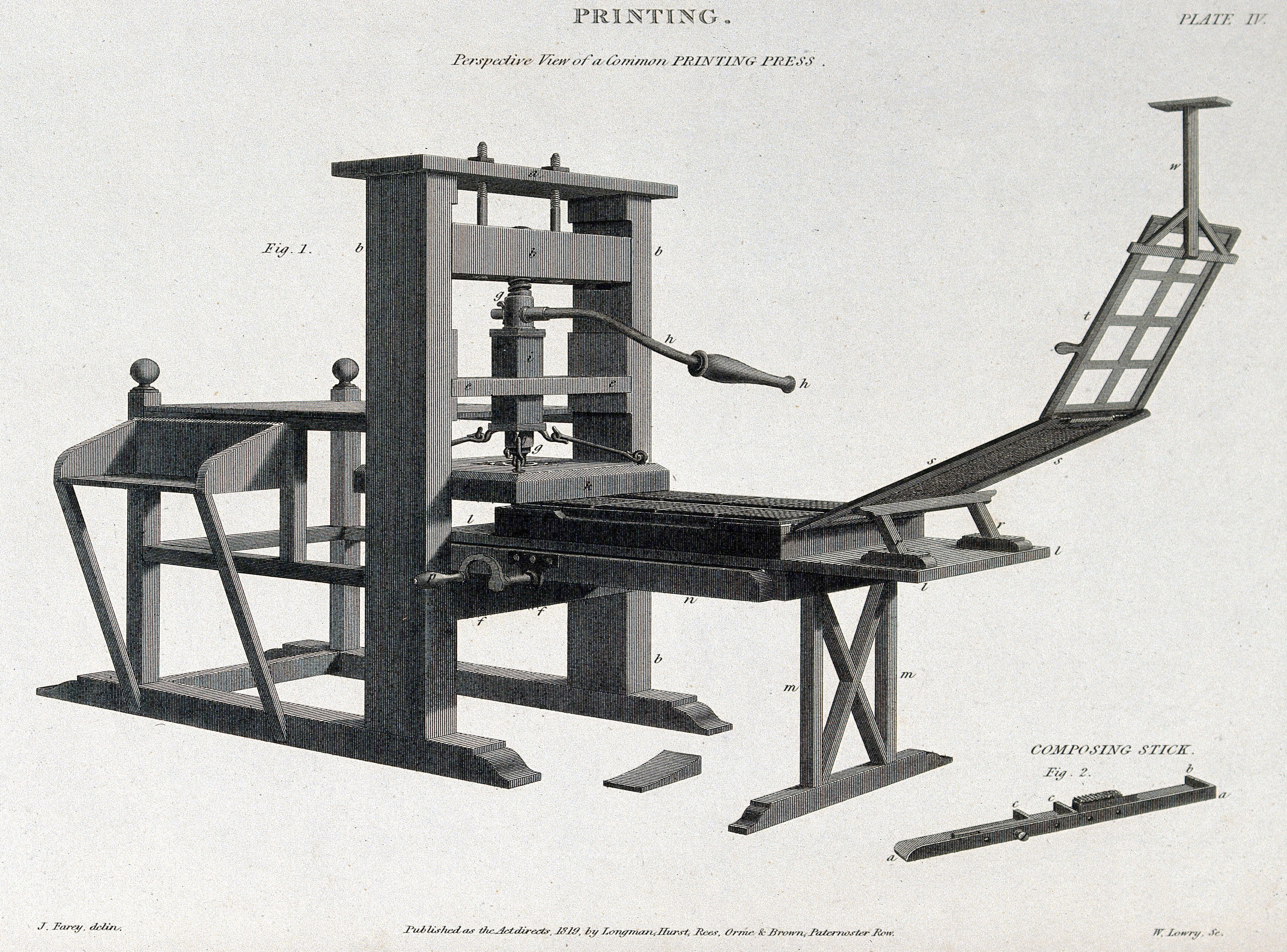
Printing press, engraving by W Lowry after John Farey Jr., 1819

Woodcut depicting four printing press workers, 1568. The worker at front left collects a printed sheet from the press, the worker to his right inks another sheet, and two workers in the background work with metal movable type. shows the printer on the left removing a printed sheet while the printer on the right inks the type. In a working day, two men could perform 14,000 hand movements and produce c. 3,600 impressions.

Gutenberg began working on the printing press around 1436, when he partnered with the gemcutter Andreas Dritzehn and the paper miller Andreas Heilmann. The first known mention of Gutenberg's work is in a 1439 lawsuit against him which describes his types, type molds, and collection of metals. Gutenberg had formerly worked as a professional goldsmith, and had obtained knowledge of metals from that craft. He was the first to produce type from an alloy of lead, tin, and antimony. This alloy produced a particularly durable type suitable for high-quality printing. To create these lead types, Gutenberg used a special matrix that allowed him to rapidly and precisely mold new type blocks from a uniform template. His type case is estimated to have contained 290 separate letter boxes including special characters, ligatures, and punctuation marks.

Gutenberg is also credited with introducing an oil-based ink, which was more durable than the previously used water-based inks. He used both paper and vellum (high-quality parchment) in his printing. He created a trial of color printing for a few of the page headings in the Gutenberg Bible, present only in some copies. The Mainz Psalter of 1453, likely designed by Gutenberg, featured elaborate red and blue printed initials and was published by his successors Johann Fust and Peter Schöffer.

=== Operation ===
A classical printing press is a stationary machine about 5 to 7 feet (1.5 to 2.1 m) long, 3 feet (0.91 m) wide, and 7 feet (2.1 m) tall. A compositor set the type, the small individual metal letters, into the desired lines of text. Several lines were arranged at once and inserted into a wooden frame, the galley. Once the correct number of pages was composed, the galleys were laid face up in another frame called a forme, which rested on a flat stone, the bed.

The type was inked using two pads of leather called ink balls and mounted on wooden handles. The ink balls were stuffed with wool or horsehair, and the leather was usually sheepskin, but sometimes also calfskin and dogskin. The compositor pressed the ink balls together to distribute the ink evenly, and then applied the balls to the type. A sheet of dampened paper was held together by various small pins and two thin frames, the tympan and the frisket. The paper was placed on the tympan, and the frisket, which contained cut-out openings matching the type, was folded over the sheet to protect the margins from ink.

The tympan and frisket were then folded down so that the paper rested on the inked type. The rounce (a small handle) and the windlass (a winch) were used to wind the bed under the platen. The compositor pulled a long lever, the bar, which drove a screw that pressed the platen onto the paper, and the elastic nature of the machine caused the bar to spring back after each pull. The rounce was then rotated in the opposite direction to move the bed away from the platen, the tympan and frisket were lifted, and the printed sheet was removed. Human hand worked the entire process until the development in the early 19th century of iron presses, some of which could be operated by steam power.

=== Mass production and spread in Europe ===
The spread of printing in the 15th century from Mainz, Germany

European book output rose from a few million to around one billion copies within a span of less than four centuries.

Gutenberg's mechanical movable-type printing press, alongside consumer demand for printed copies of Bibles and other religious works, precipitated the widespread growth of the printing industry across Europe. Gutenberg's print shop in Mainz was originally the only one in Europe, but by the end of the 15th century around 270 European cities were involved in printing. As early as 1480, there were printers active in 110 different places in Germany, Italy, France, Spain, the Netherlands, Belgium, Switzerland, England, Bohemia and Poland. The historians Lucien Febvre and Henri-Jean Martin conclude that by this date, the printed book was used throughout Europe.

In Italy, a center of early printing, print shops existed in 77 cities and towns by 1500, while 151 locations in Italy had hosted printing at some point by 1600. In 1600, nearly 3,000 printers are known to have been active in Italy. However, printing centers soon emerged, and one third of the Italian printers published in Venice.

By 1500, printing presses throughout Western Europe had produced over 20 million copies. Their output grew to an estimated 150–200 million copies by 1600. European printing presses c. 1600 could produce between 1,500 and 3,600 impressions per workday. By comparison, with manual woodblock printing, a skilled printer could print 1,500 to 2,000 double sheets per day. A printing block could be used for up to 25,000 prints with repairs. The Korean Kabin font metal movable type developed in 1434 could print 40 sheets per day. At least 750,000 copies of Erasmus's works were sold during his lifetime (1469–1536), while Martin Luther became Europe's most published author c. 1520, at the start of the Reformation. Printers across Germany reprinted 291 editions of Luther's 45 original works, and between 1518 and 1520 they distributed 300,000 printed copies of his works, with the widespread printing surprising both the pope and secular rulers.

Newspapers arose due to faster typographical production and falling costs (see Relation), and provided a new means of conveying current information to the public. The historian Andrew Pettegree argues that the Reformation directly contributed to the market for printed news. Printers who had gained readers from Luther's pamphlets kept them by producing news sheets discussing current events. These news pamphlets closely resembled the Reformation Flugschriften (printed pamphlets) in format, typically running to four or eight pages in quarto. In the early seventeenth century, a German publisher issued news bulletins on a regular schedule, creating the first weekly newspaper, and after the format spread it remained the principal news medium in northern Europe for over a century. Many libraries in Europe and North America contain works printed before 1501, known as incunabula.

=== Global spread ===
The printing press spread rapidly across Europe largely because the equipment was portable, making censorship efforts difficult. When religious or government entities attempted to curtail the technology in one city, the printers would relocate to neighboring cities, further accelerating the press's spread across Europe. Colonial and missionary networks spread the European-style printing press even farther, as Jesuit missionaries established a press at Goa in 1556 with João de Bustamante as its first printer. The Portuguese Jesuit Diogo de Mesquita acquired a press during a visit to Europe in 1586 and maintained it at Nagasaki, producing religious works in Japanese until his death in 1614. The Dominicans set up the first press in the Philippines, publishing the Doctrina Christiana. In the Ottoman Empire, Sephardi Jews quickly established a Hebrew press in Constantinople in 1493, an Armenian press was established in 1567, and a Greek press in 1627. The first printing press in the Middle East, the Safed Hebrew printing press, was established by two Ashkenazi Jewish immigrants in 1577. İbrahim Müteferrika established the first Arabic-script press for a Muslim readership in 1727. Esad of Ioannina assisted Müteferrika in the development of his press, which produced seventeen works before 1742. In the Americas, Juan Pablos established the first press in Mexico City in 1539, working on behalf of the Seville-based publisher Juan Cromberger, while British colonists established another press at Cambridge, Massachusetts, in 1638.

=== Industrial printing presses ===
The overall design of the wooden handpress was largely consistent throughout its long history, but its construction and performance improved considerably over three centuries, with metal screws replacing wooden ones c. 1550 and the tympan and frisket becoming standard fittings. Around 1620, the Dutch cartographer Willem Blaeu introduced a press with a more advanced hose arrangement and a more reliable mechanism for moving the type form into position beneath the platen, and printers introduced further changes over the next two centuries. As new metal components were introduced, the straight lever bar was curved to facilitate its movement, and screw dimensions were adjusted to suit particular press sizes. By the closing years of the wooden-press era, the Ramage press enhanced the speed of printing by incorporating a mechanism that returned the platen automatically after each impression. According to one estimate, these improvements raised press productivity by a factor of three or four between the mid-15th and late-16th centuries.

Several more innovations and improvements followed before the start of the Industrial Revolution. By 1800, Lord Stanhope had built the first iron printing press, which maintained the screw of the wooden hand press but increased the pressure from a single pull through a new arrangement of bar and spindle. To allow greater force on the frame, Stanhope cast the structure in iron. The Stanhope press could print a whole sheet in one pull, its chief advantage over the wooden press, and did so with far less effort on the lever. It could print 480 pages per hour, double the output of the old press.

The use of steam power for running the machinery and the rotary motion of cylinders also drastically altered the design of the printing press, and the German printer Friedrich Koenig successfully introduced both elements in his press designs developed between 1802 and 1818. Koenig moved to London in 1806, where the printers Thomas Bensley, George Woodfall, and Richard Taylor financed his experiments. In 1810, Koenig patented a press in 1810 that operated on both a steam engine and the old platen. A machine made to this design entered operation in Bensley's office in April 1811, with the engineer Andreas Friedrich Bauer assisting. He patented his first cylinder machine in October 1811. John Walter of The Times ordered two steam-driven double machines built under Koenig's patent of 1813, with The Times printing 1,100 sheets an hour on them from 29 November 1814. A further patent of 1814 covered a perfecting machine that printed both sides of a sheet in one operation; the first example was completed in 1816.

==== Rotary press ====
In the United States, Richard M. Hoe invented the steam-powered rotary printing press in 1843, which could produce millions of copies of a page in a single day. The transition to rolled paper, with continuous feed, greatly increased the rate of the presses. Hoe's original design produced up to 8,000 pages per, with 2,000 revolutions per hour each printing four page images. By 1891, The New York World and the Philadelphia Item were operating presses that produced either 90,000 four-page sheets per hour or 48,000 eight-page sheets.

In the mid-19th century, a separate class of jobbing presses emerged for small-format commercial work such as cards, billheads, and leaflets. Stephen P. Ruggles pioneered the platen jobber in Boston from the 1830s, and George Phineas Gordon refined it. Gordon's Franklin press was so influential that by 1894 at least eleven firms were manufacturing Gordon-type presses, and James Moran estimates that between 1840 and 1940, no fewer than 123 different kinds of treadle-driven jobbers were made in the United States alone. The quick pace of the platen jobber made it a significant force in reshaping the printing trade during the 19th century.

==== Machine composition ====
Type continued to be set by hand long after the press itself had been mechanized. Two hot-metal systems automated composition toward the end of the nineteenth century. Ottmar Mergenthaler's Linotype operated on a keyboard and assembled matrices to cast a whole line of type at once, and it became widely used, while Tolbert Lanston's 1887 Monotype cast single characters from hot metal. As most text was now machine set, hand-set foundry type went into decline, and machine composition remained standard until phototypesetting and digital methods displaced it in the later 20th century.

=== Later developments ===
During the 20th century, printing technology moved beyond the letterpress principle. Offset printing, developed in the early 1900s, transfers an image from a plate to a rubber blanket and then to paper, and its speed and high quality made it the dominant commercial printing method by mid-century. The introduction of phototypesetting in the 1960s and 1970s replaced hot-metal type composition with photographic methods, and the spread of desktop publishing software from the mid-1980s shifted much of the typesetting process to personal computers. By the early 21st century, digital printing had made short-run and on-demand production commercially viable, while offset remained the standard for high-volume work.

== Impact ==
The wide circulation of information and ideas due to the printing press has been called the "printing revolution", and the historian Elizabeth Eisenstein described the press as an "agent of change" across various societies. After its invention, books were produced and sold in greater numbers, authors were more closely associated with their works, reading became a more individualistic affair, and Latin declined as a scholarly language. In 1997, Time Life selected Gutenberg's invention of the printing press as the most important event of the second millennium.

=== Authorship and reading ===
The printing press resulted in a greater association between authors and their texts, and the production of identical copies allowed for the precise citation of references and attached greater importance to individual authors and their exact words. For many works produced before the printing press, the name of the author has been entirely lost. The consistency of the printed page gave authors new encouragement to number pages and include tables of contents and indices in their books.

Reading habits also shifted, due to the lower cost and wider availability of printed texts compared to manuscripts. Individuals shifted away from communal oral recitation toward silent and private reading, marking what Eisenstein describes as a transition "from a hearing public to a reading public". A sermon or speech had required listeners to gather in one place at one time, whereas people scattered across a continent could read a printed text. The reading public was therefore highly individualistic, and its members often did not know each other. After the printing press was invented, wider availability of texts contributed to increasing adult literacy rates across Europe in the next two centuries, although the growth of literacy differed regionally.

By the end of the 15th century, printers had circulated editions of major classical works across Europe, and the printed book had come to play a central role in the diffusion of classical literature. Many Greek scholars came to Italy after the collapse of the Byzantine Empire, and between 1495 and 1515 the Venetian printer Aldus Manutius drew on their knowledge and published many Greek works in printed editions. Without the press, the equivalent recovery of Latin texts had taken over a century. Book production became increasingly commercial, and the first copyright laws were passed.

=== Science ===
The press also changed how natural philosophers worked. Although Latin scientific treatises rarely became bestsellers, the shift from script to print preceded the conceptual revolutions of the sixteenth century rather than following them. Ptolemy's Almagest, published in the 2nd century AD, remained authoritative as an astronomical text for some 1400 years before Copernicus's De revolutionibus surpassed it in 1543, but De revolutionibus was surpassed in less than 100 years. According to Eisenstein, the shift emerged largely not due to the genius of the later investigators but the introduction of printing. Scholars had previously circulated discoveries individually through manuscript letters, but could now circulate them with printing to more people, communicate faster with each other, and reach a wider geographical range.

Printing also enabled the establishment of communities of scientists across Europe who could collaborate using shared methods. These communities had first appeared in the era of incunabula, well before the first learned journals of the late 17th century. They incorporated the serial publication of new findings, allowed for data to survive across generations, and moved away from professional secrecy to encourage the public to read the written works and discuss them with authors and editors. Hand-copied medical and botanical illustrations gradually degenerated, while printed copies of these illustrations preserved the detail. Observers such as Andreas Vesalius could now correct the visual record by circulating well-drawn illustrations alongside their texts.

=== Politics, state and church ===
Governments adapted quickly to printing, using it to publish policies including treaties and declarations of war in pamphlet form. In the 1530s, the English politician Thomas Cromwell's campaign supporting Henry VIII's break with the Catholic Church marked the first time a European government sought to exploit the press for propaganda. Cromwell got printers and publicists to issue vernacular tracts defending royal supremacy, while Parliament approved the religious split. The French monarchy also printed tracts to evoke the patrie as the realm of France personified by the king. Printing thus allowed early modern states to carry out "psychological war" alongside military operations.

Various Catholic clergy attempted to curtail the political reach of print provoked sustained efforts at control, starting with the Mainz archbishop's licensing edict of 1485 and followed by a 1515 papal decree requiring all translations to be vetted by bishops or inquisitors. The Counter-Reformation papacy expanded these restrictions, as Papal Indexes forbade lay Catholics to read certain books, including vernacular Bibles. Secular governments also introduced licensing systems for printing, and some jurisdictions banned imported books. These measures were only partially successful, as printed material easily crossed borders and many cities had secret presses. Over the next three centuries, authorities seeking to regulate the press often came into conflict with those seeking to circulate forbidden material. Pettegree argues that print was especially important in 16th-century religious conflicts such as French Wars of Religion and the Dutch Revolt. In territories which suppressed open Protestant proselytism, Reformed ideas reached the public through pamphlets, broadsheets and clandestine printing, and Catholics also used these mediums. Printed newspapers, pamphlets and bulletins later played a major ideological role in the events before the English Civil War and the American and French Revolutions, through.

Quantitative work in economics has tested some of these claims. Jeremiah Dittmar has shown that over the 16th century, cities which had established presses by 1500 grew around 60 percent faster than comparable cities which had not. Separate regressions using distance from Mainz as an instrument for press adoption support that finding. Also analyzing distance, Jared Rubin estimates that cities with presses before 1500 were 52 percent more likely to have adopted Protestantism by 1530, 42 percent more likely by 1560, and 29 percent by 1600. The declining effect suggests that the press mattered most in the early Reformation, before politics and the wider diffusion of printing took over.

Sascha Becker, Steven Pfaff, and Jared Rubin distinguish between supply-side and demand-side accounts of the Reformation. Supply-side accounts emphasize institutional or technological factors such as the press; demand-side accounts emphasize the religious, political, and economic grievances that drew populations and rulers toward reform. However, Davide Cantoni finds that the religious policies of German princes were influenced by those of their immediate neighbors, rather than by print exposure alone. Another report notes that 36 percent of cities with documented contact with Luther had adopted the Reformation by 1530, compared with 6 percent of cities without contact. Its authors argue that personal ties and trade-route diffusion also contributed to religious conversions. The press is now generally treated as one of several causes rather than the only one.

Benedict Anderson places printing in a longer arc of political change. He notes that in many states, people believed in a sacred script, the divine right of kings, and the inseparability of time and cosmology. For Anderson, print-capitalism was crucial in challenging these beliefs. It replaced sacred languages with vernaculars and accustomed readers to news in homogeneous calendrical time.

=== Contemporary criticism ===
Some contemporaries were critical of printing. Dominican friar Filippo de Strata, writing c. 1473, called the press a "whore" (meretrix) compared to the "virgin" pen, and argued that printers valued profit over accuracy and scholarship. In De laude scriptorum manualium (1492), Benedictine abbot Johannes Trithemius argued that printing would discourage books and that paper books were fragile compared to parchment manuscripts. He also stated that mechanical production of sacred text could not replace the spiritual discipline of hand-copying. In 1470, Florentine humanist Niccolò Perotti claimed that many printed books were inaccurate, while a decade later Gerolamo Squarzafico claimed that most printers were illiterate and Giorgio Merula worried that printing could harm classical scholarship. The Swiss physician Paracelsus promoted direct observation over book learning, although he made full use of print to broadcast his views. Some critics were concerned that untrained readers might develop heretical ideas as they gained access to religious texts.

=== Language ===
As printing spread, Latin ceased to be the dominant language of publication. Authors wrote more frequently in the vernacular language of each region, and printed texts helped to standardize the spelling and syntax of these languages, reducing their variability. Febvre and Martin argue that printing contributed more than any other factor to the development of national languages. They also view printing as contributing to the rise of nationalism in Europe.

== Printing capacity ==
The table gives reported hourly output for several press designs.

Printing speed of press designs
Design	Year	Impressions per hour
Hand-operated presses
Gutenberg-style	c. 1600	240
Stanhope press	c. 1800	480
Steam-powered presses
Koenig press	1812	800
Koenig press	1813	1100
Koenig press	1814	2000
Koenig press	1818	2400

== Gallery ==
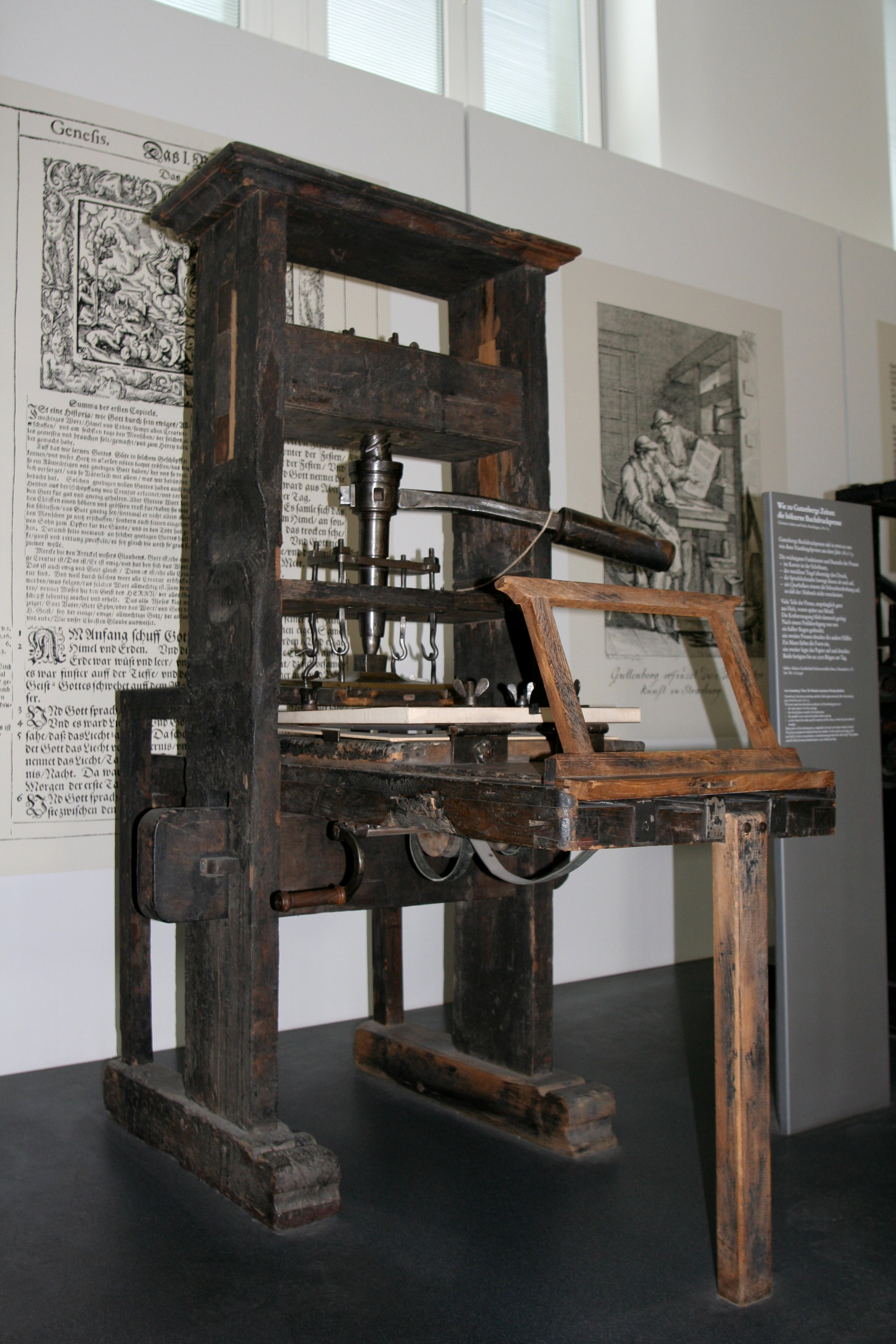
Printing press from 1811

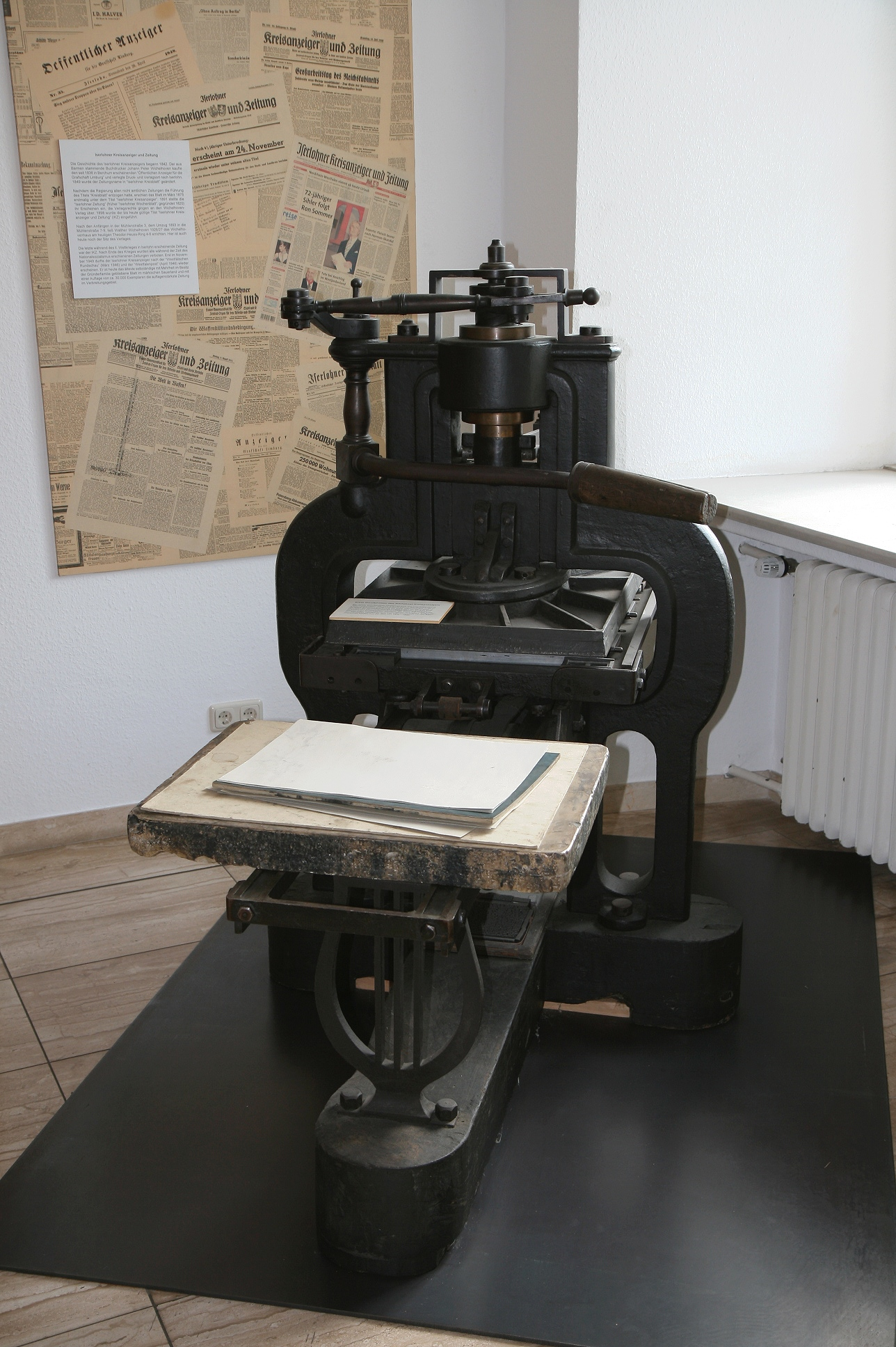
Stanhope press from 1842

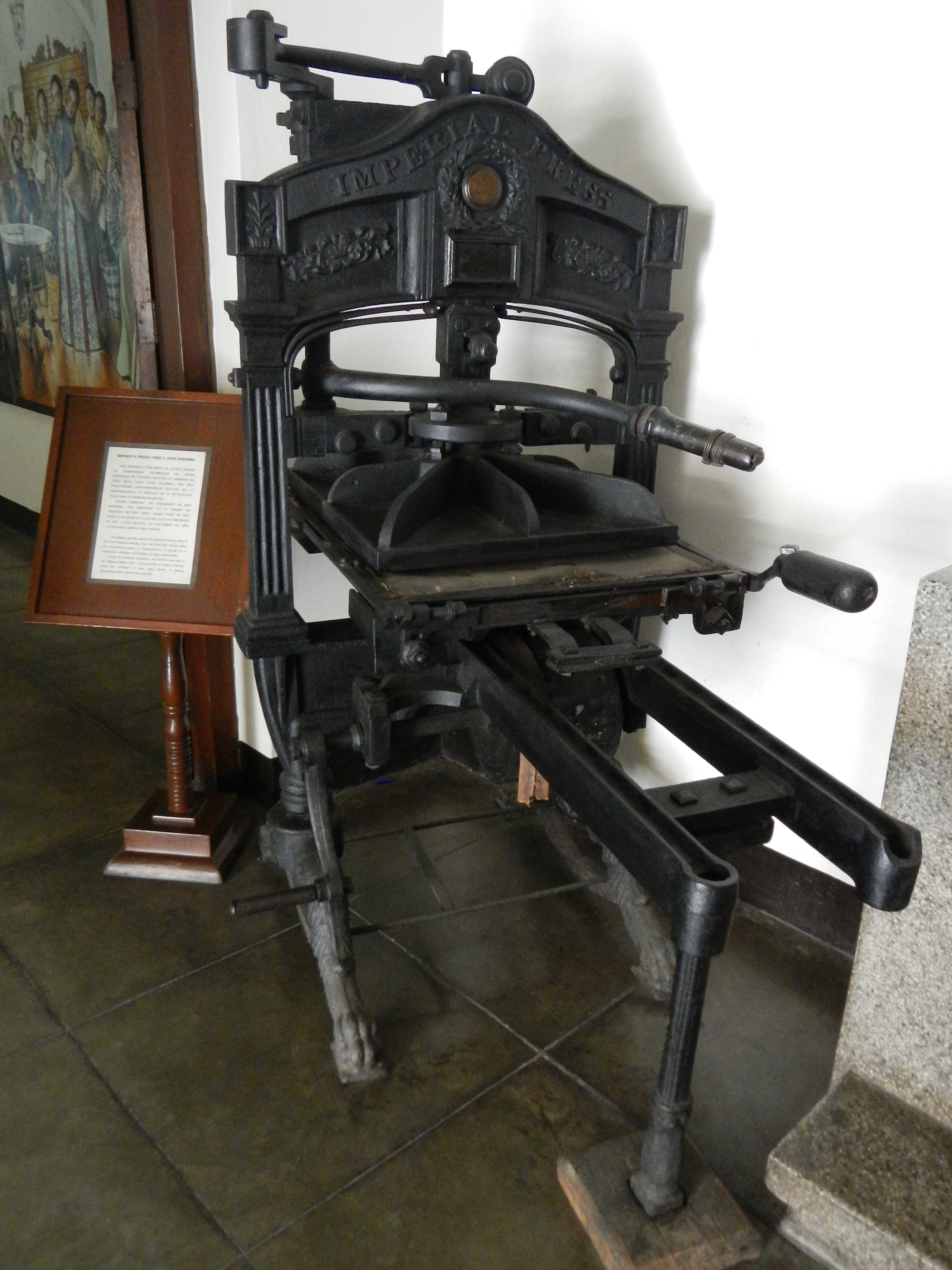
Printing press by John Sherwin, 1860

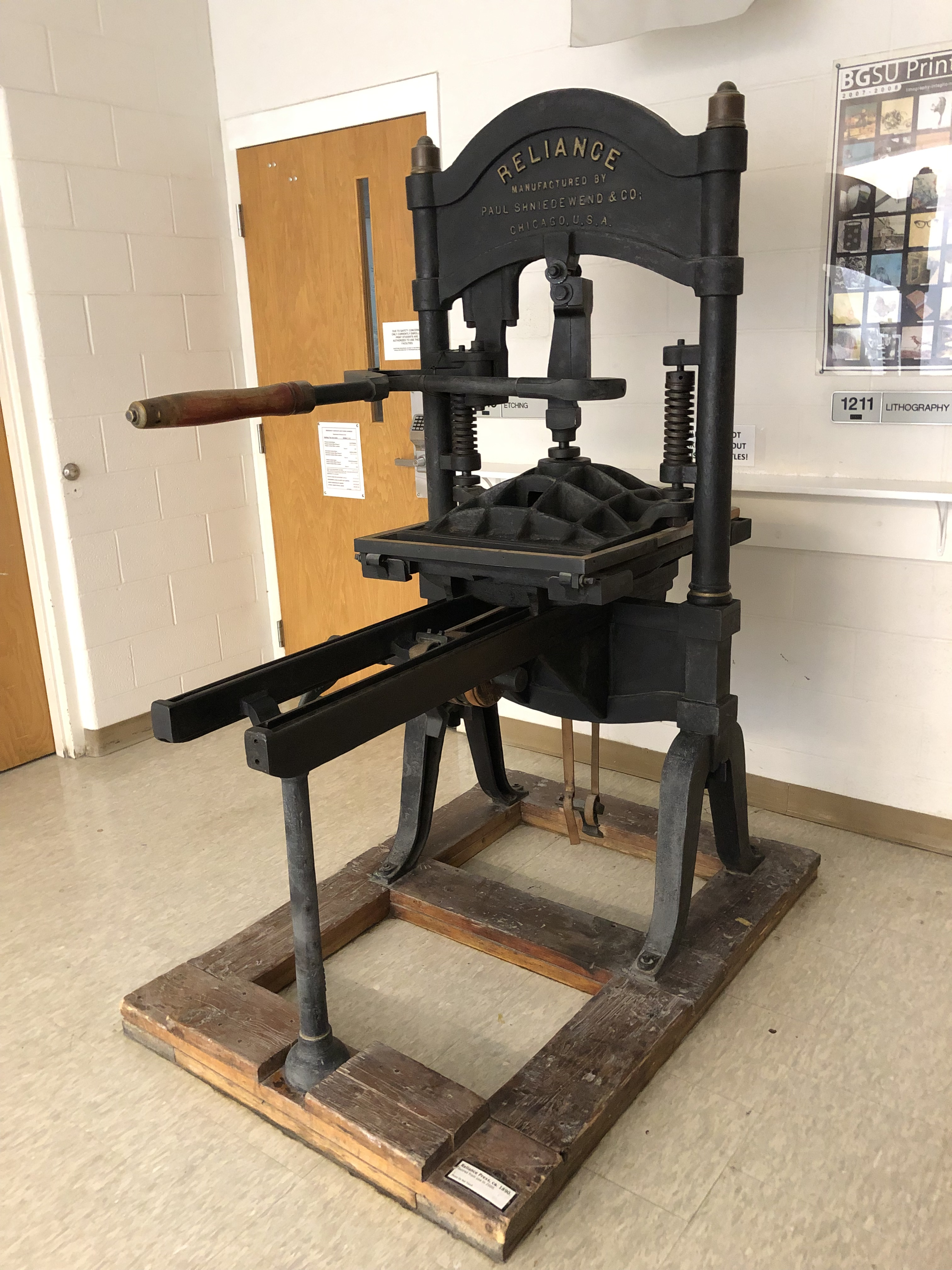
Reliance Printing Press from the 1890s

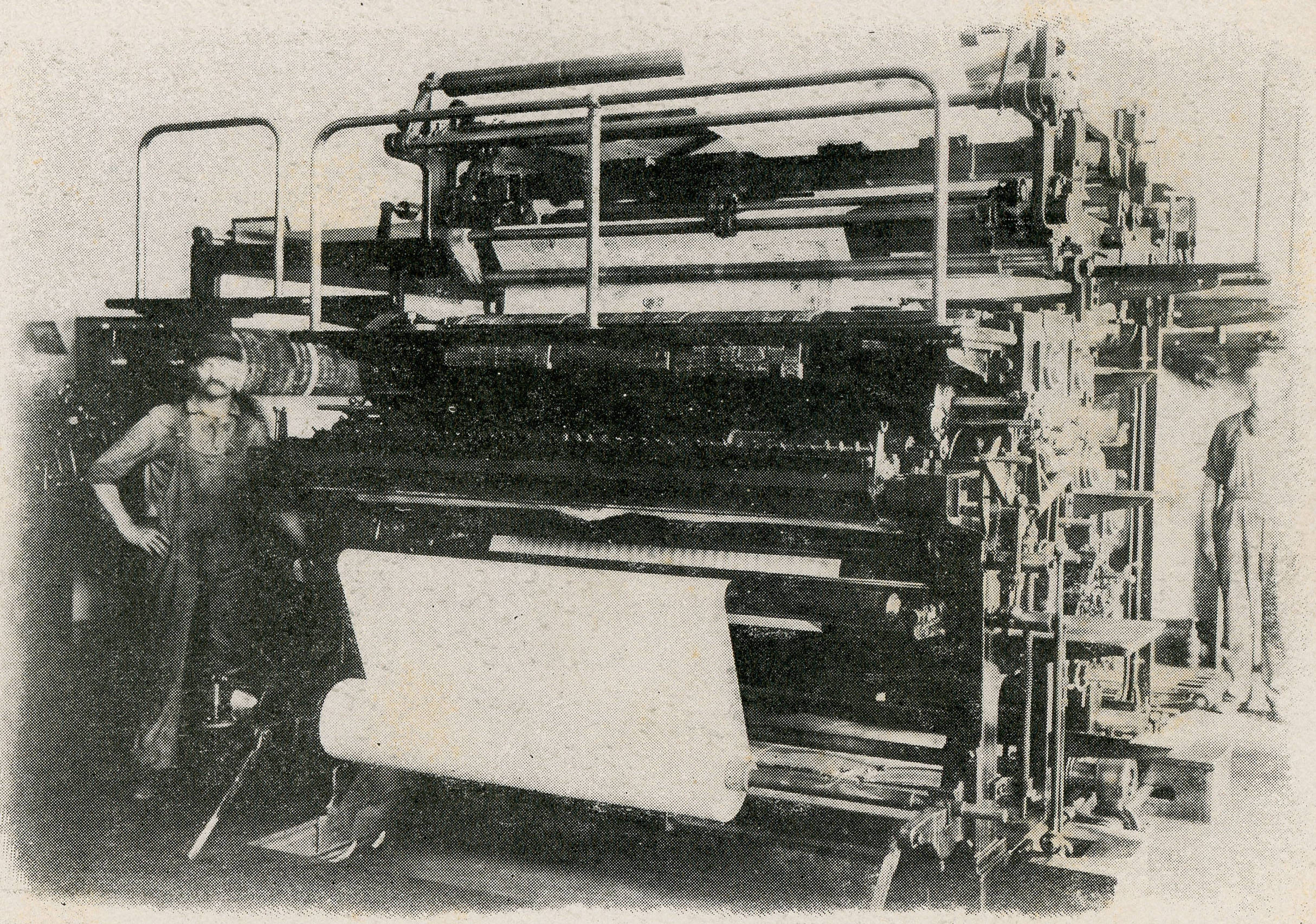
Toledo Blade newspaper printing press

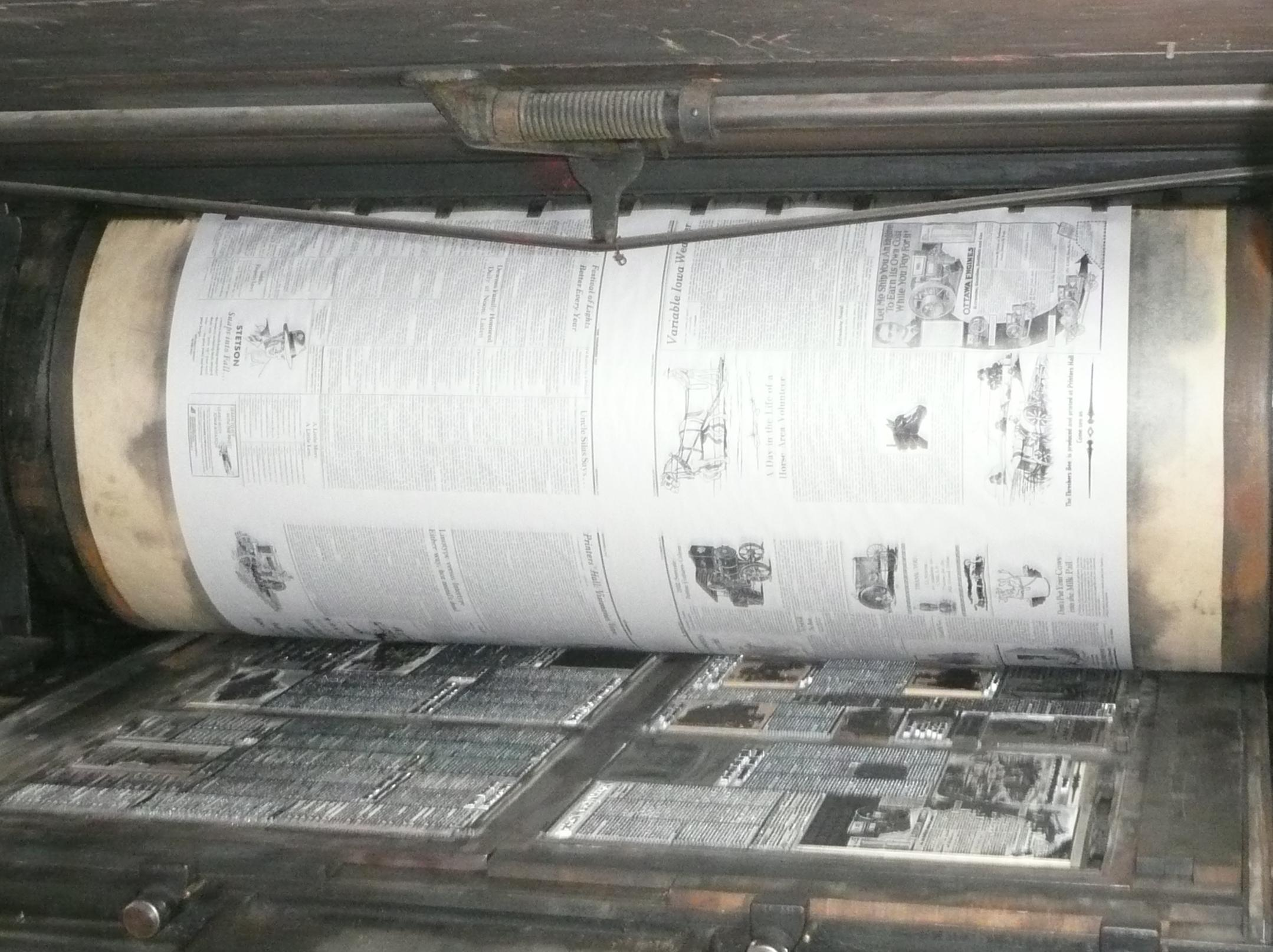
A Miehle flat-bed cylinder press in operation

== See also ==
- Adana Printing Machines
- Albion press
- Augustus Applegath, inventor of the vertical-drum rotary printing press
- Color printing
- Early American publishers and printers
- Flexography
- Heidelberg Platen Press
- Imprimatur
- Printer's hat
- William Caxton, who set up the first printing press in England in 1476

== Bibliography ==
=== On the effects of the printing press ===
- Anderson, Benedict (2006) [1983], Imagined Communities: Reflections on the Origin and Spread of Nationalism (revised ed.), London: Verso, ISBN 978-1-84467-086-4
- Bailyn, Bernard; Hench, John B., eds. (1981) [1980]. The Press & the American Revolution. Boston: Northeastern University Press (Originally published: Worcester, Mass.: American Antiquarian Society). ISBN 978-0-9303-50307. (Google book)
- Barker, Nicolas (1978), "The Invention of Printing: Revolution within Revolution", The Quarterly Journal of the Library of Congress, 35 (2): 64–76, JSTOR 29781767
- Becker, Sascha O.; Pfaff, Steven; Rubin, Jared (2016), "Causes and consequences of the Protestant Reformation", Explorations in Economic History, 62: 1–25, doi:10.1016/j.eeh.2016.07.007
- Becker, Sascha O.; Hsiao, Yuan; Pfaff, Steven; Rubin, Jared (2020), "Multiplex network ties and the spatial diffusion of radical innovations: Martin Luther's leadership in the early Reformation", American Sociological Review, 85 (5): 857–894, doi:10.1177/0003122420948059
- Buringh, Eltjo; van Zanden, Jan Luiten (2009), "Charting the "Rise of the West": Manuscripts and Printed Books in Europe, A Long-Term Perspective from the Sixth through Eighteenth Centuries", The Journal of Economic History, 69 (2): 409–445, doi:10.1017/s0022050709000837, S2CID 154362112
- Cantoni, Davide (2012), "Adopting a New Religion: The Case of Protestantism in 16th Century Germany", The Economic Journal, 122 (560): 502–531, doi:10.1111/j.1468-0297.2012.02495.x, hdl:10230/19925
- Dittmar, Jeremiah E. (2011), "Information Technology and Economic Change: The Impact of the Printing Press", The Quarterly Journal of Economics, 126 (3): 1133–1172, doi:10.1093/qje/qjr035
- Eisenstein, Elizabeth L. (1980), The Printing Press as an Agent of Change, Cambridge University Press, ISBN 978-0-521-29955-8
- Febvre, Lucien; Martin, Henri-Jean (1997), The Coming of the Book: The Impact of Printing 1450–1800, London: Verso, ISBN 978-1-85984-108-2
- Lee, Alexander (2022), The War Against Printing, Engelsberg Ideas
- Lent, John A. (1980), "The Missionary Press of Asia, 1550–1860", Communicatio Socialis, 14 (2): 119–141, doi:10.5771/0010-3497-1980-2-119
- Man, John (2002), The Gutenberg Revolution: The Story of a Genius and an Invention that Changed the World, London: Headline Review, ISBN 978-0-7472-4504-9
- Rubin, Jared (2014), "Printing and Protestants: An Empirical Test of the Role of Printing in the Reformation", The Review of Economics and Statistics, 96 (2): 270–286, doi:10.1162/REST_a_00368, JSTOR 43554930
- Trithemius, Johannes; Behrendt, Roland (1974), In Praise of Scribes: De Laude Scriptorum, Lawrence, Kansas: Coronado Press, ISBN 978-0-87291-066-9

=== Technology of printing ===
- Bolza, Hans (1967), "Friedrich Koenig und die Erfindung der Druckmaschine", Technikgeschichte (in German), 34 (1): 79–89
- Borsa, Gedeon (1976), "Druckorte in Italien vor 1601", Gutenberg-Jahrbuch (in German): 311–314
- Borsa, Gedeon (1977), "Drucker in Italien vor 1601", Gutenberg-Jahrbuch (in German): 166–169
- Brekle, Herbert E. (1995), "Eine weitere Spur einer typographischen Werkstatt beim Kloster Prüfening im 12. Jahrhundert", Gutenberg-Jahrbuch (in German), 70: 23–26
- Brekle, Herbert E. (1997), "Das typographische Prinzip. Versuch einer Begriffsklärung", Gutenberg-Jahrbuch (in German), 72: 58–63
- Brekle, Herbert E. (2005), Die Prüfeninger Weihinschrift von 1119. Eine paläographisch-typographische Untersuchung (brief summary) (in German), Regensburg: Scriptorium Verlag für Kultur und Wissenschaft, ISBN 978-3-937527-06-2
- Burns, Robert I. (1996), "Paper comes to the West, 800–1400", in Lindgren, Uta (ed.), Europäische Technik im Mittelalter. 800 bis 1400. Tradition und Innovation (in German) (4th ed.), Berlin: Gebr. Mann Verlag, pp. 413–422, ISBN 978-3-7861-1748-3
- Childress, Diana (2008), Johannes Gutenberg and the Printing Press, Minneapolis: Twenty-First Century Books, ISBN 978-0-7613-4024-9
- Duchesne, Ricardo (2006), "Asia First?", The Journal of the Historical Society, 6 (1): 69–91, doi:10.1111/j.1540-5923.2006.00168.x
- Hanebutt-Benz, Eva-Maria (2000), "Gutenbergs Erfindungen", Gutenberg. Aventur und Kunst: Vom Geheimunternehmen zur ersten Medienrevolution (in German), Mainz: Stadt Mainz, pp. 158–189
- Hellinga, Lotte (2007), "The Gutenberg Revolutions", in Eliot, Simon; Rose, Jonathan (eds.), A Companion to the History of the Book, Blackwell Publishing, pp. 207–220, ISBN 978-1-4051-2765-3
- Issawi, Charles (1980), "Europe, the Middle East and the Shift in Power: Reflections on a Theme by Marshall Hodgson", Comparative Studies in Society and History, 22 (4): 487–504, doi:10.1017/s001041750000949x, S2CID 143805644
- Kapr, Albert (1996), Johannes Gutenberg. The Man and his Invention, Aldershot: Scolar, ISBN 978-1-85928-114-7
- Koch, Walter (1994), Literaturbericht zur mittelalterlichen und neuzeitlichen Epigraphik (1985–1991), Monumenta Germaniae Historica: Hilfsmittel (in German), vol. 14, München: Harrassowitz Verlag, ISBN 978-3-44717-094-9
- Lehmann-Haupt, Hellmut (1940), "Englische Holzstempelalphabete des XIII. Jahrhunderts", Gutenberg-Jahrbuch (in German): 93–97
- Lipinsky, Angelo (1986), "La pala argentea del Patriarca Pellegrino nella Collegiata di Cividale e le sue iscrizioni con caratteri mobili", Ateneo Veneto (in Italian), 24: 75–80
- Lucas, Adam Robert (2005), "Industrial Milling in the Ancient and Medieval Worlds. A Survey of the Evidence for an Industrial Revolution in Medieval Europe", Technology and Culture, 46 (1): 1–30, doi:10.1353/tech.2005.0026, S2CID 109564224
- Lyons, Martyn (2011), Books: A Living History, Los Angeles: Getty Publications, ISBN 978-1-60606-083-4
- Mahnke, Helmut (2009), Der kunstreiche Johannes Gutenberg und die Frühzeit der Druckkunst (in German), Norderstedt: Books on Demand, ISBN 978-3-8370-5041-7
- Meggs, Philip B. (1998), A History of Graphic Design (3rd ed.), John Wiley & Sons, ISBN 978-0-471-29198-5
- Moran, James (1973), Printing Presses: History and Development from the Fifteenth Century to Modern Times, Berkeley: University of California Press, ISBN 978-0-520-02245-4
- Needham, Joseph (1965), Science and Civilisation in China, Physics and Physical Technology, vol. 4, Cambridge University Press
- Oh, Young Kyun (2013), Engraving Virtue: The Printing of a Premodern Korean Moral Primer, Brill
- Onken, Björn (2009), "Presses", in Cancik, Hubert; Schneider, Helmuth (eds.), Brill's New Pauly
- Pettegree, Andrew (2005), Reformation and the Culture of Persuasion, Cambridge: Cambridge University Press, doi:10.1017/CBO9780511614613, ISBN 978-0-521-60264-8
- Pettegree, Andrew (2015), Brand Luther: How an Unheralded Monk Turned His Small Town into a Center of Publishing, Made Himself the Most Famous Man in Europe – and Started the Protestant Reformation, New York: Harper Press, ISBN 978-1-59420-496-8
- Pollak, Michael (1972), "The Performance of the Wooden Printing Press", The Library Quarterly, 42 (2): 218–264, doi:10.1086/620028, JSTOR 4306163
- "Printing", Encyclopædia Britannica, 2006
- Roberts, Colin H.; Skeat, T. C. (1983), The Birth of the Codex, London: Oxford University Press, ISBN 978-0-19-726024-1
- Schneider, Helmuth (2007), "Technology", in Scheidel, Walter; Morris, Ian; Saller, Richard (eds.), The Cambridge Economic History of the Greco-Roman World, Cambridge University Press, pp. 144–171, ISBN 978-0-521-78053-7
- Schulte, Alfred (1939), "Papierpresse, Druckerpresse und Kelter", Gutenberg-Jahrbuch (in German): 52–56
- Thompson, Susan (1978), "Paper Manufacturing and Early Books", Annals of the New York Academy of Sciences, 314 (1): 167–176, Bibcode:1978NYASA.314..167T, doi:10.1111/j.1749-6632.1978.tb47791.x, S2CID 85153174
- Tsien, Tsuen-Hsuin (1985), Paper and Printing, Science and Civilisation in China, vol. 5, Cambridge University Press
- Weber, Johannes (2006), "Strassburg, 1605: The Origins of the Newspaper in Europe", German History, 24 (3): 387–412, doi:10.1191/0266355406gh380oa
- White, K. D. (1984), Greek and Roman Technology, London: Thames and Hudson
- Widmann, Hans (1974), "Der koreanische Buchdruck und Gutenbergs Erfindung", Gutenberg-Jahrbuch (in German): 32–34
- Wilkinson, Endymion (2012), Chinese History: A New Manual, Harvard University Asia Center for the Harvard-Yenching Institute, ISBN 978-0-674-06715-8
- Wolf, Hans-Jürgen (1974), Geschichte der Druckpressen (in German) (1st ed.), Frankfurt/Main: Interprint
