= Mariátegui =

Mariátegui is a surname of Basque origins. Notable people with the name include:

- Javier Mariátegui (1928–2008), Peruvian intellectual and psychiatrist
- José Carlos Mariátegui (1894–1930), Peruvian intellectual, journalist, political philosopher, and activist
- José-Carlos Mariátegui (born 1975), Peruvian scientist, writer, curator and scholar
- Manuel de Mariátegui, 1st Count of San Bernardo (1842–1905), Spanish noble and politician
- Sandro Mariátegui Chiappe (1921–2013), Peruvian politician who was the prime minister of Peru

== See also ==
- BAP Mariátegui (FM-54), Peruvian Carvajal-class frigate
- Mariategui JLT, Peruvian insurance brokerage company
