= John Lindberg =

John Lindberg may refer to:

- JLT (John Lindberg Trio)
- John Lindberg (jazz musician) (born 1959), American jazz musician
- John Lindberg (singer) (born 1987), Swedish rockabilly singer
- John G. Lindberg (1884–1973), Finnish ophthalmologist
