= Graphotype =

Method of producing printing blocks

Graphotype was a process of autographic engraving by which typographic printing blocks were produced.

== Process ==
A block of chalk or some similar material is reduced to a level surface on which a design is drawn with a glutinous ink sufficiently fluid to penetrate into the porous chalk. When the ink is dry, gentle friction is applied to the surface of the block so as gradually to rub away those parts of the chalk which are not indurated by the glutinous ink. The lines of the drawing being thus left in relief, a perfect model of the required printing block is obtained and this model is next hardened by immersion in a bath containing a solution of an alkaline silicate. After this, the block is dried and reproduced by the stereotype or the electrotype process.

This method of typographic engraving was brought to a practical form and patented in 1860 by an American wood engraver, Mr. de Witt Clinton Hitchcock. The first step in his process is to reduce French chalk or talc to an extremely fine state of division by repeated grindings, elutriations, and siftings. After this is complete, a layer of the material (over an eighth of an inch in thickness) is forced down upon and made to adhere to a thick zinc plate, the necessary pressure being obtained by means of a hydraulic press, the platen of which is faced with a polished steel plate, so as to communicate a good surface to the layer of compressed French chalk. The device is now drawn reversed on the prepared block with an ink consisting of a weak solution of glue colored by lamp black or some other pigment. In drawing on the prepared block, care must be taken not to damage the somewhat tender surface of the compressed chalk and the safest instrument with which to apply the glutinous ink is a fine sable brush, but an ordinary pen may be employed if the operation of drawing is performed with caution. A pad of silk velvet or a fitch brush may be used for rubbing the block so as to leave the lines in relief, and it is quite sufficient to continue the friction until a depth equal to the thickness of an ordinary playing card is produced, the spaces corresponding to any extended whites of the engraving being then cut out by means of a tool. A 10% solution of sodium silicate may be used for hardening the block and, when dry, nothing remains but to take a mould from it and to reproduce it in metal.
