= Chandler & Price =

Maker of platen printing presses and related equipment (1881–1964)

Chandler and Price
- Type: Defunct
- Industry: Graphic Arts Equipment
- Founded: Cleveland, Ohio, United States, 1881
- Founders: Harrison T. Chandler and William H. Price
- Defunct: 1964

Chandler & Price was founded in 1881 in Cleveland, Ohio, by Harrison T. Chandler and William H. Price. They manufactured machinery for printers including a series of hand-fed platen jobbing presses, as well as an automatic feeder for these presses (the Rice Feeder), paper cutters, book presses, and assorted equipment. Despite dominating the industry in the 1930s, by the 1950s the offset printing industry had eclipsed the world of movable type printing, and only Chandler & Price and Brandtjen and Kluge continued to make open platen (Gordon) presses. Chandler & Price ceased production of presses in 1964.

There are three main generations of the Chandler & Price press, all distinguished by the style of the flywheel: Old Style (1884-1914; wavy spokes), New Style (1911-1964; plain spokes), or Craftsman (1921-1964; solid flywheel). The size given for these presses was that of the 'chase' (removable frame that held the type or other matter to be printed). The smallest of these presses was known as the 'Pilot', a lever-operated, tabletop unit (its chase was approximately 6x8, ideal for business cards or the like).

The Chandler & Price 'New Style' press was so popular that The Practice Of Printing: Letterpress and Offset by Ralph Polk, the standard textbook for thousands of high school printing programs in the middle of the 20th century, used the press as its example when teaching students the basics of press operation.
