= Gerhard Lauer =

German literary scholar

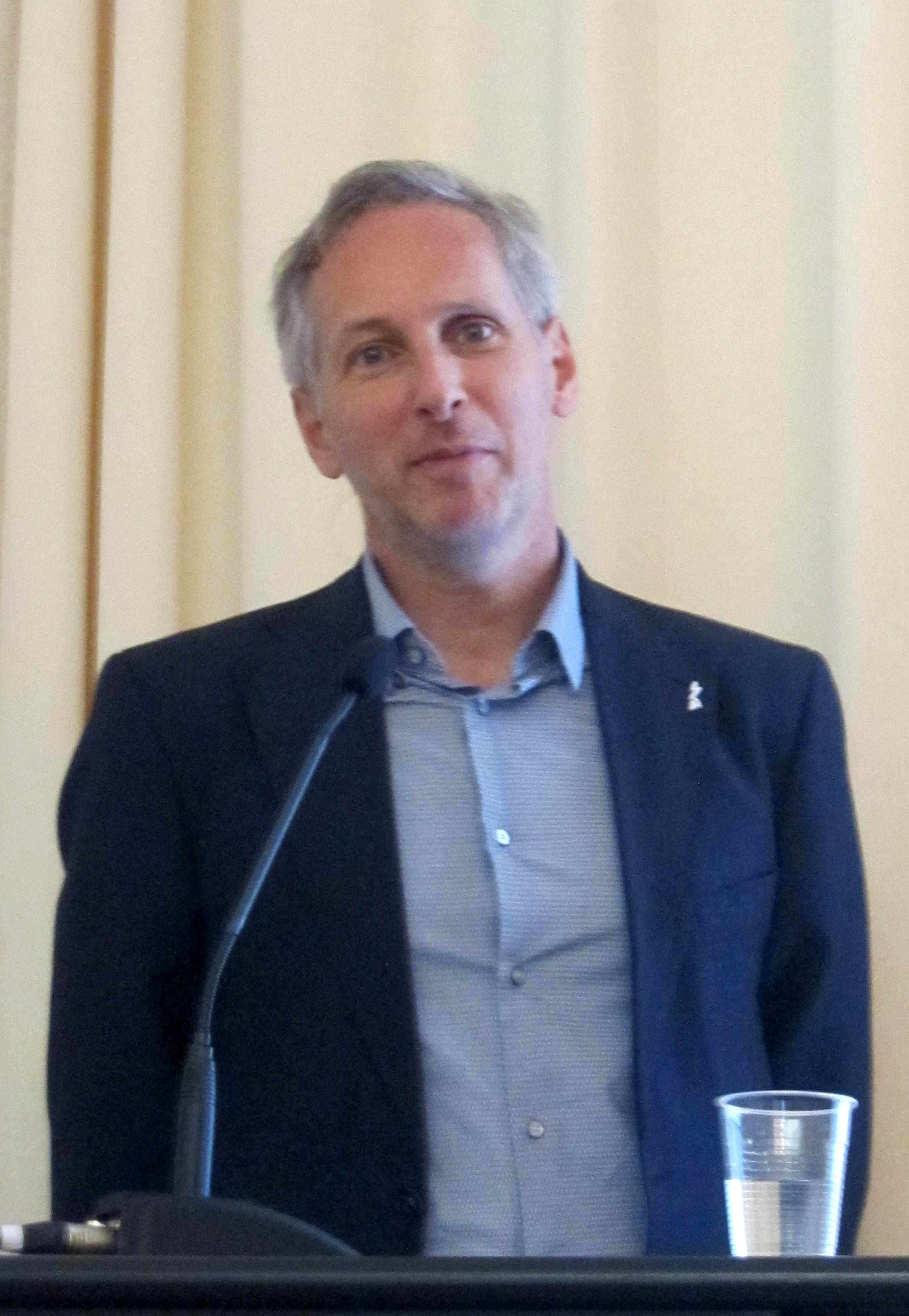
- Born: November 14, 1962 (age 63); Karlsruhe, Germany
- Education: LMU Munich
- Occupations: Academic; Literary scholar; Professor of Book Studies at the University of Mainz
- Website: gerhardlauer.de

Gerhard Lauer (born November 14, 1962) is a German literary scholar. He is currently Gutenberg Professor of Book and Reading Studies at the University of Mainz. He works on literary history, reading studies, and digital humanities.

Lauer initially studied literary studies, philosophy, and musicology at the Saarland University and the University of Tübingen, and completed his undergraduate degree at LMU Munich. He was then trained in German studies and Jewish studies. He went on to complete his Doctor of Philosophy in 1992 on the history of scholarship in exile with Wolfgang Frühwald as his doctoral supervisor. In 2000, he defended his habilitation on the rise of the Haskalah.

In 2002, he succeeded Wilfried Barner, who had succeeded Albrecht Schöne in 1992, as chair of Modern German Literature at the University of Göttingen. Lauer is a member of the Göttingen Academy of Sciences and Humanities, was distinguished Max Kade visiting professor at the Washington University in St. Louis, senior research fellow at the Institut of Advances Studies/St Mary's College, Durham University, is a cofounding editor of the Journal of Literary Theory, associate editor of the journal Scientific Study of Literature, and acts now as editor of the Gutenberg-Jahrbuch.

== Works ==
- Die verspätete Revolution. Erich Kahler. Wissenschaftsgeschichte zwischen konservativer Revolution und Exil. De Gruyter 1995. ISBN 978-3-1101-4397-3
- Rückkehr des Autors. Zur Erneuerung eines umstrittenen Begriffs (with Fotis Jannidis, Matias Martinez and Simone Winko. Niemeyer 1999. ISBN 978-3-4843-5071-7
- Regeln der Bedeutung. Zur Theorie der Bedeutung literarischer Texte (with Fotis Jannidis, Matias Martinez and Simone Winko. De Gruyter 2003. ISBN 978-3-1101-7558-5
- Exile, Science, and Bildung : The Contested Legacies of German Emigre Intellectuals (with David Kettler). Palgrave Macmillan 2005. ISBN 978-1-4039-6843-2
- Das Erdbeben von Lissabon und der Katastrophendiskurs im 18. Jahrhundert (with Thorsten Unger). Wallstein 2008. ISBN 978-3-8353-0267-9
- Die Rückseite der Haskala. Geschichte einer kleinen Aufklärung. Wallstein 2008. ISBN 978-3-8353-0345-4
- Grenzen der Literatur. Zu Begriff und Phänomen des Literarischen (with Simone Winko and Fotis Jannidis. De Gruyter 2009. ISBN 978-3-1101-8930-8
- Die Erfindung des Schriftstellers Thomas Mann (with Michael Ansel and Hans-Edwin Friedrich). De Gruyter 2009. ISBN 978-3-1102-0136-9
- Literaturwissenschaftliche Beiträge zur Generationsforschung. Wallstein 2010. ISBN 978-3-8353-0571-7
- Lexikon Literaturwissenschaft. Hundert Grundbegriffe (with Christine Ruhrberg). Reclam 2011. ISBN 978-3-1501-0810-9
- Kunst und Empfindung. Zur Genealogie einer kunsttheoretischen Fragestellung in Deutschland und Frankreich im 18. Jahrhundert (with Elisabeth Décultot). Winter 2012. ISBN 978-3-8253-5890-7
- Herder und die Künste. Ästhetik, Kunsttheorie, Kunstgeschichte (with Elisabeth Décultot). Winter 2013. ISBN 978-3-8253-6132-7
- Constantin Brunner im Kontext. Ein Intellektueller zwischen Kaiserreich und Exil (with Irene Aue-Ben-David and Jürgen Stenzel). Oldenbourg 2014. ISBN 978-3-1103-7382-0
- Wilhelm von Humboldt. Schriften zur Bildung. Stuttgart: Reclam 2017. ISBN 978-3-15-019456-0
- Johann Friedrich Blumenbach. Race and Natural History, 1750–1850 (with Nicolaas Rupke). Routledge 2019. ISBN 978-1-138-73842-3
- West-Östliche Wahlverwandtschaften. Hans Bethge und die historischen und ästhetischen Konstellationen um 1900 (with Yixu Lu). Königshausen & Neumann. 2020. ISBN 978-3-8260-6879-9
- Was macht die Digitalisierung mit den Hochschulen (with Bert te Wildt, Robin Schmidt, Marko Demantowsky). De Gruyter 2020. ISBN 978-3-11-067322-7
- Lesen im digitalen Zeitalter. wbg Academics 2020. ISBN 978-3-534-26854-2
- Fabula 64(1/2). Special Issue: Computational Folktale Studies. (Guest-Ed.) 2023. ISSN 0014-6242
- Gutenberg-Jahrbuch 98. Ed. with Philip Ajouri, Julia Bangert, Nikolaus Weichselbaumer. Harrassowitz. Wiesbaden 2023. ISBN 978-3-447-12016-6
- Gutenberg-Jahrbuch 99. Ed. with Philip Ajouri, Julia Bangert, Nikolaus Weichselbaumer. Harrassowitz. Wiesbaden 2024. ISBN 978-3-447-18394-9
- Was machen Digitalisierung und Künstliche Intelligenz mit der Psychotherapie?. Ed. with Bert te Wildt, Robin Schmidt. de Gruyter Oldenbourg. Berlin 2024. ISBN 978-3-111-50872-6
- Gutenberg-Jahrbuch 100. Ed. with Philip Ajouri und Nikolaus Weichselbaumer. Harrassowitz. Wiesbaden 2025. ISBN 978-3-447-18436-6
- Type. Buchdruck in Europa und Asien. Ed. with Volker Benad-Wagenhoff, Cornelia Schneider, Zvijezdana Cordier. Harrassowitz. Wiesbaden 2025. ISBN 978-3-447-12415-7
- Johann Friedrich Blumenbach’s ‚Bildungstrieb‘. „What is life?“ in science, philosophy, and politics around 1800. Ed. with Nicolaas Rupke. Göttingen University Press. Göttingen 2025. ISSN 1863-0197
- Gutenberg-Jahrbuch 101. Ed. with Philip Ajouri und Nikolaus Weichselbaumer. Heidelberg University Publishing. Heidelberg 2026. ISBN 978-3-96822-386-5
