= Gutenberg-Jahrbuch =

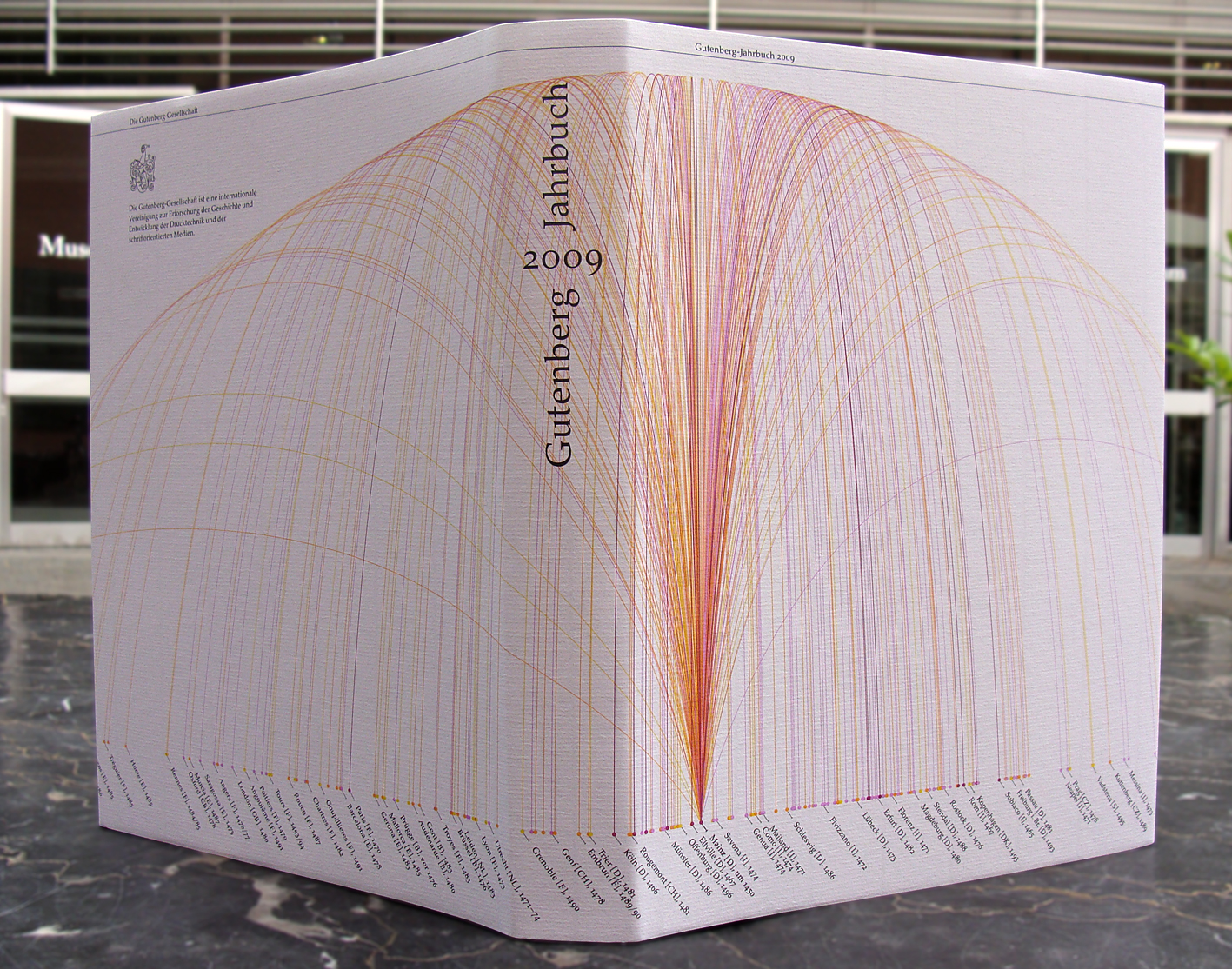
- Discipline: History of typography and history of books
- Language: Multilingual
- Edited by: Gerhard Lauer

Publication details
- History: 1926–present
- Publisher: Internationale Gutenberg-Gesellschaft (Germany)
- Frequency: annually

Standard abbreviations
- ISO 4: Gutenb.-Jahrb.

Indexing
- ISSN: 0072-9094
- OCLC no.: 1715243

Links
- Journal homepage

The Gutenberg-Jahrbuch is an annual periodical publication covering the history of printing and the book. Its focus is on incunables, early printing, and the life and work of Johannes Gutenberg, inventor of the modern printed book. It has been published since 1926 by the Internationale Gutenberg-Gesellschaft, the international association for the study of the history and development of printing technology and written media. Gerhard Lauer is editor since 2023.

== See also ==
- Gutenberg Museum
- Gutenberg Prize of the International Gutenberg Society and the City of Mainz
