= Journal of Literary Theory =

- Discipline: Literary theory
- Language: English, German
- Edited by: Fotis Jannidis, Gerhard Lauer, Simone Winko

Publication details
- History: 2007 to present
- Publisher: Walter de Gruyter (Germany)
- Frequency: Biannual

Standard abbreviations
- ISO 4: J. Lit. Theory

Indexing
- ISSN: 1862-5290 (print); 1862-8990 (web)
- OCLC no.: 275168927

Links
- Journal homepage; Journal page at publisher's site

The Journal of Literary Theory is a double-blind peer-reviewed academic journal published by Walter de Gruyter since 2007. The journal is dedicated to research in literary theory. It takes an interdisciplinary approach and includes a broad variety of theories and methods. Publication languages are English and German. The journals is accompanied by a website, JLTonline offering selected articles from the journal as well as reviews, conference proceedings, and other information relevant to the field. The Journal was founded by Fotis Jannidis, Gerhard Lauer, and Simone Winko in 2007.

The journal was included on the lists of journals taken into account for research evaluations of the Danish Research Ministry and the Australian Excellence in Research for Australia (ERA) initiative.
