= John Lindberg Trio =

- Also known as: John Lindberg Rockabilly Trio (2004-2006); JLT
- Origin: Sweden
- Genres: Rockabilly
- Years active: 2006-present
- Label: Cosmos Records
- Members: John Lindberg (2004-) vocals and guitar Joakim Dunker (2004-) drums Nathanael Marcusson (2016-) double-bass
- Past members: Patrik Backlund (2004-2006) double-bass Martin Engström (2006-2015) double-bass
- Website: www.johnlindberg.se

John Lindberg Trio is a Swedish musical trio fronted by singer John Lindberg on vocals and guitar. The trio also includes Nathanael Marcusson on double-bass and Joakim Dunker on drums.

John Lindberg of the Swedish trio should not confused with the American jazz musician and bass player John Lindberg).

== Career ==
John Lindberg started singing at age 13 with his guitar with rockabilly style. Soon John Lindberg on main vocals and guitar was joined by bass player Martin Engström and drummer Joakim Dunker, forming John Lindberg Rockabilly Trio. Under that name, they released their debut album in 2006 self-titled John Lindberg Rockabilly Trio. Finding good reception, they toured in Christmas 2006 opening for The Refreshments.

They rebranded the band John Lindberg Trio and started including other musical influences like alternative rock besides the starting rockabilly tradition and releasing their follow-up album Win or Lose. But it was with their third album Brand New Philosophy in October 2009 under Cosmos record label that the band found commercial success with the album reaching #1 in the Swedish Albums Chart.

After rebranding the band yet again as JLT (abbreviation of the former name John Lindberg Trio) or as JLT (John Lindberg Trio), a fourth album with even bigger success was released with Made For Rock N Roll under Enviken record label hitting #2 on the Swedish Albums Chart. The band have released their fifth album together in May 2012 called Hell of a Ride under the Cosmos record label and have also hit #3 in the Albums chart.

== Discography ==
As John Lindberg Rockabilly Trio

- 2006: John Lindberg Rockabilly Trio

As John Lindberg Trio

| Year | Single | Peak position | Certification |
| Year | Single | SWE | Certification |
|---|---|---|---|
| 2007 | Win or Lose | - | |
| 2009 | Brand New Philosophy | 11 | |

As JLT (John Lindberg Trio)

| Year | Single | Peak position | Certification |
| Year | Single | SWE | Certification |
|---|---|---|---|
| 2011 | Made for Rock N Roll | 2 | |
| 2012 | Hell of a Ride | 3 | |
| 2012 | Rock This Christmas | 14 | |
| 2014 | Dig It | 6 | |
| 2017 | Straight from the Heart | 10 | |
