= Mariátegui JLT =

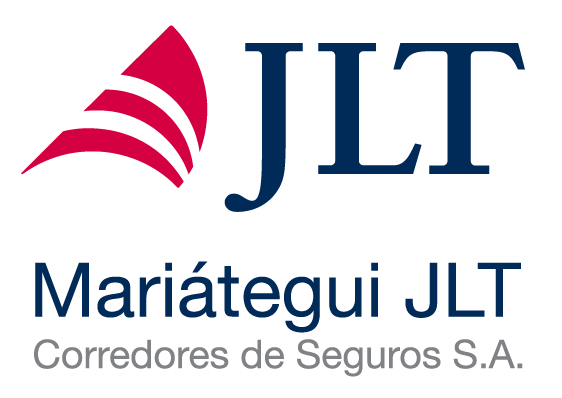
- Founded: 1987; 39 years ago, Lima, Peru
- Headquarters: Lima, Peru
- Website: www.jltperu.com

Mariátegui JLT Corredores de Seguros S.A. is a Peruvian company dedicated to insurance brokerage since 1987. It belongs to the Jardine Lloyd Thompson Group. Its main office is located in Lima, with additional offices in the cities of Piura, Chiclayo, Trujillo, Arequipa and Tacna.

== Background ==
Mariátegui JLT was created in 1987, and the Reinsurance office—today JLT Peru—was established in 1989. At present, Mariátegui JLT has more than 90 professionals dedicated to insurance brokerage specializing in corporate insurance.

In 1997, Mariátegui & Asociados associated with Heath Lambert, working with them for 7 years. In November, 2004, Mariátegui JLT signed the strategic alliance with the Jardine Lloyd Thompson Group, one of the largest insurance and reinsurance brokers in the world, with affiliates in more than 130 countries, and which main office is located in Europe.

== Areas ==
- Property & Casualty: a property insurance policy that takes care of covering the loss suffered as a result of an insured risk, within the property of the insurance holder.
- Human Risks: A personal insurance policy offering fast indemnity of a loss owing to or an event affecting the welfare of the insured parties. It may cover one individual or a group.

== Mariátegui JLT and the Decentralized 2011 Tournament ==
On February 10, 2011 during a press conference offered by the Asociación Deportiva de Fútbol Profesional (ADFP) (Professional Football Sports Association) an announcement was made regarding the agreement that Mariátegui JLT and ACE Seguros had entered into to make personal accident insurance available to Peruvian football fans, to offer them protection before and during the matches of the "Movistar Cup" Decentralized Tournament, a benefit for every fan buying a ticket of admission to a game.

== Certifications and acknowledgements ==
- ISO 9001: The Mariátegui JLT Corredores de Seguros S.A. Quality Managing System was certified in August, 2005 and re-certified in August, 2008 having besides the certifications of UKAS (United Kingdom Accreditation Service) of the United Kingdom for all the processes of the services granted.
- Award to Business Creativity 2010, in the Category of Banking, Insurance and Financing, granted by the Universidad Peruana de Ciencias Applicadas (UPC). This award was granted to ATP Partners SAC and Mariátegui JLT Corredores de Seguros S.A. for their Strategic Alliance to renew the fleet of taxis in Lima and raise the quality of life of taxi drivers. It was considered that an integrated insurance system had been created that made it possible for taxi drivers to have access to credit and thus, improve the taxi fleet.
- Great Place to Work Award 2010: Every year, the Great Place to Work Institute of Peru, awards the companies which have best improved its labor policies, with respect to the previous year.
