= George Phineas Gordon =

American printer (1810–1878)

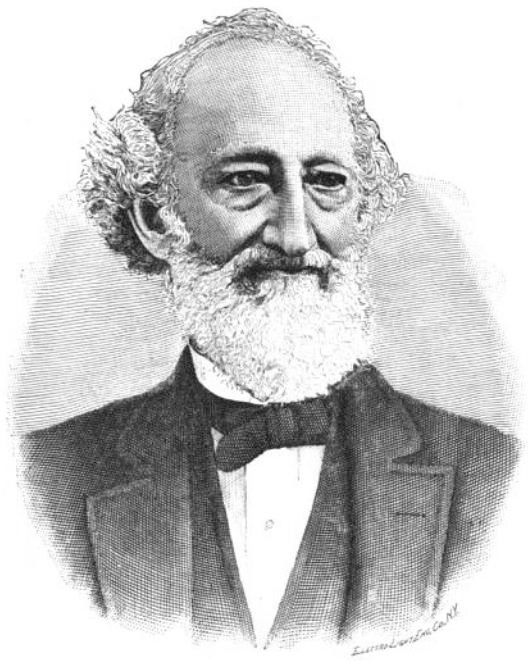
- Born: April 21, 1810; Salem, New Hampshire
- Died: January 27, 1878 (aged 67); Norfolk, Virginia
- Occupations: Inventor, printer, businessman
- Parent(s): Phineas Gordon; Mary (White) Gordon

George Phineas Gordon (April 21, 1810 – January 27, 1878) was an American inventor, printer and businessman who developed the basic design of the most common printing press ever, the Gordon Letterpress.

== Biography ==
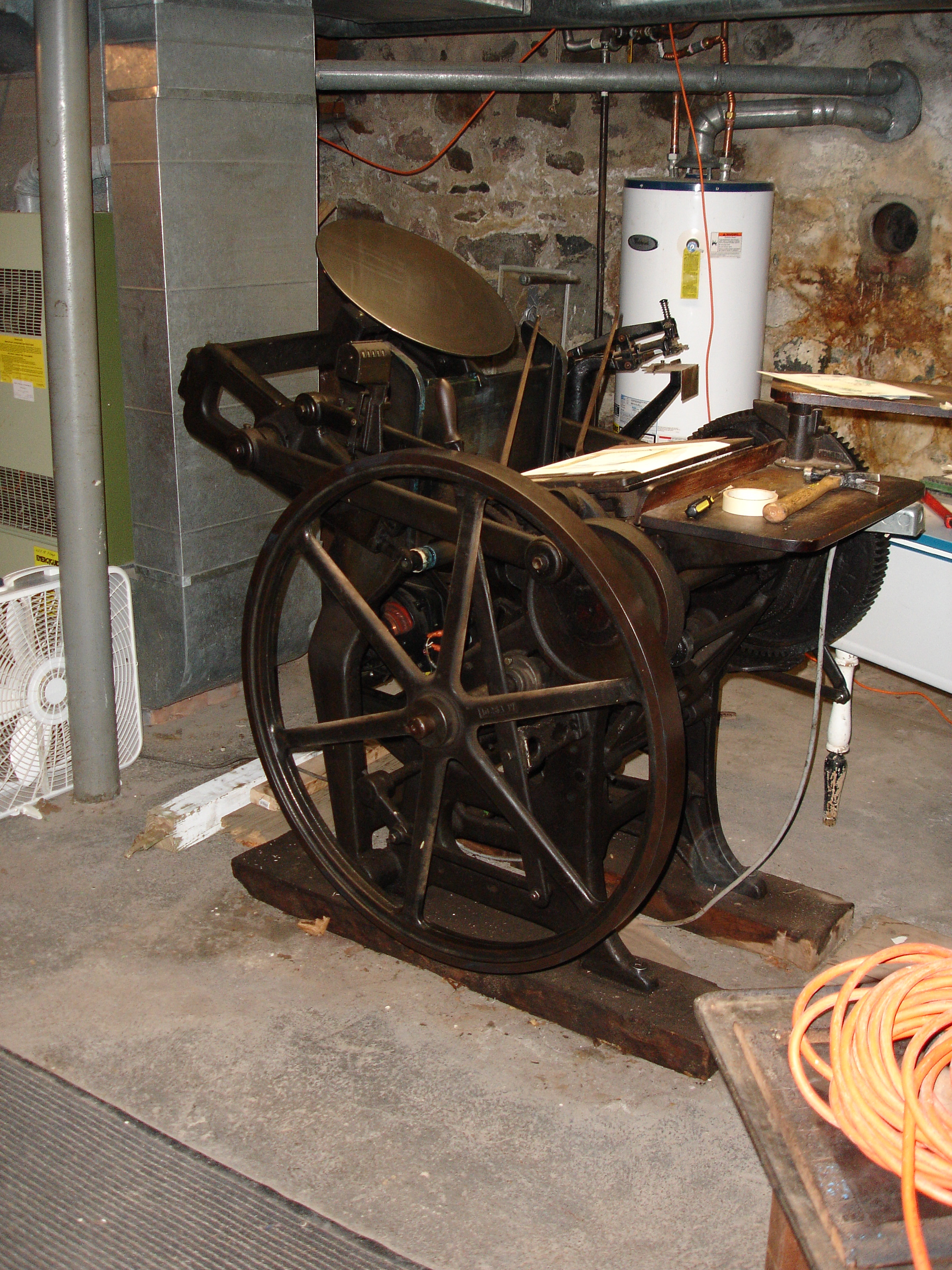
Gordon style press, made by Chandler & Price

Born in Salem, New Hampshire, where his family had lived for more than one hundred years, he was educated there and at Boston before deciding to become an actor. Failing to achieve a livelihood at this, he moved to New York where he became an apprentice printer. Upon learning the trade, he opened a job printing shop of his own. Around 1835 he began to experiment in press design. His first patent for a job press was granted in 1851. While this press had many flaws, he began to manufacture it as the "Yankee" job press. Subsequently, he introduced the "Turnover" and the "Firefly," which could produce 10,000 printed cards an hour. About 1858 he produced the "Franklin" press, which has ever since been known as the Gordon Jobber. (Gordon claimed that Benjamin Franklin had revealed the basic design of the press to him in a dream.) It was strong, well built, and easy to operate. The Gordon Press solved the problem of clam-shell presses (which previously had "snapped" and endangered pressmen's fingers) by having the platen open on cams, so that it was flat and lagged for the pressman as he fed the sheet, before closing parallel to the type bed.

Gordon began manufacturing presses in Rhode Island but in 1872 established his factory in Rahway, New Jersey. He secured over fifty patents for presses and accumulated a large fortune.

He died from heart disease at his home in Norfolk, Virginia on January 27, 1878.
