= Platen =

Surface, usually flat, used in printing, imaging, or manufacturing

Section of a platen printing press in use. The platen is the sturdy plate which applies the pressure to the paper and type.

A platen (or platten) is a platform with a variety of roles in printing or manufacturing. It can be a flat metal (or earlier, wooden) plate pressed against a medium (such as paper) to cause an impression in letterpress printing. Platen may also refer to a typewriter roller which friction-feeds paper into position below the typebars or print head. It can refer to the glass surface of a copier, and the rotating disk used to polish semiconductor wafers.

== Applications ==
=== Office equipment ===
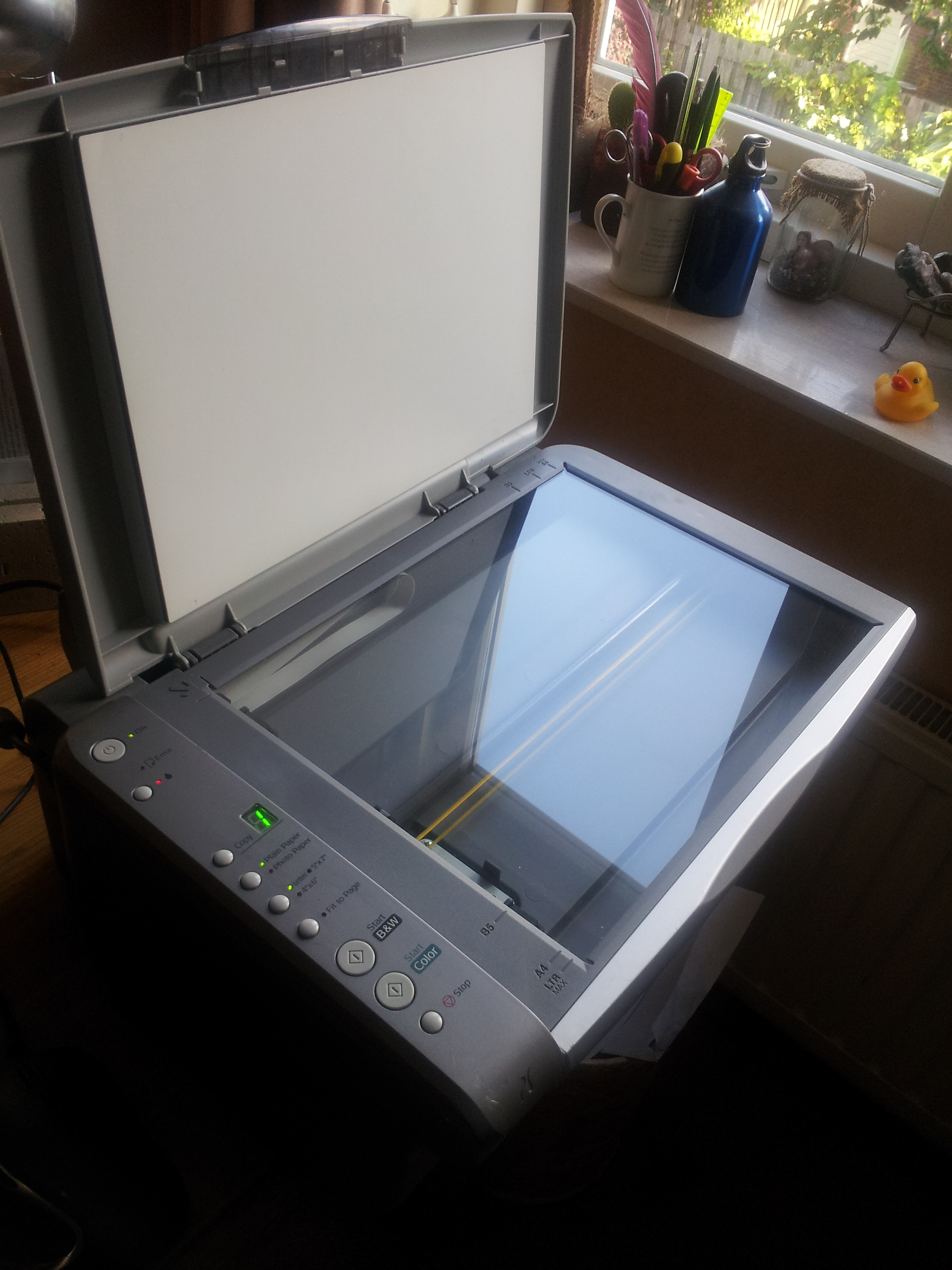
Copier

In office copiers and scanners, the platen is a flat glass surface on which operators place papers or books for scanning. The platen is also called the flatbed. Platens are also used in some printers, such as the dot-matrix printer.

=== Manufacturing and processing ===
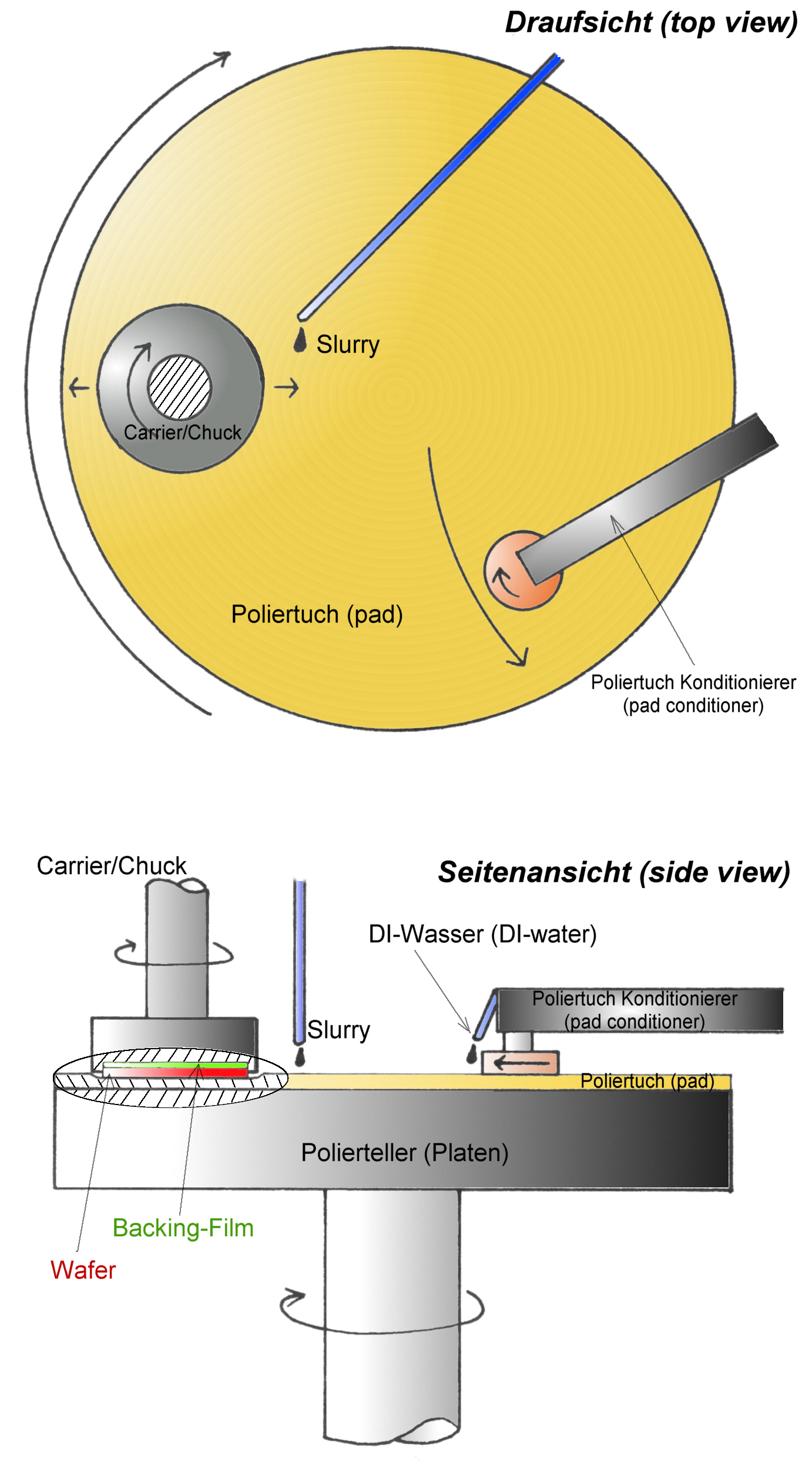
A planar in semiconductor wafer polishing

==== Semiconductor manufacturing ====
In semiconductor manufacturing, specifically chemical-mechanical planarization, a flat, rotating platen covered with a pad is used to polish semiconductor wafers (see image).

==== Screen printing ====
In textile screen printing, a platen is a flat board onto which the operator slides the garment. It is generally made of either a plywood laminate or aluminum with a rubber laminate. Often the platen will be pretreated with a spray adhesive. This allows the garment to effectively become a rigid immobile substrate, especially important when printing multiple colors or utilizing an on-press infrared dryer. The screen is brought parallel and close to the garment (often within 1/32") and the squeegee pressure then brings the screen into contact with the garment so that the ink transfer may occur. There are many special platen types, such as those for printing sleeves or pockets, vacuum platens, platens with clamps to hold bulky materials such as jackets, and even curved platens for printing on hats.

==== Woodworking ====
In woodworking, wide belt sanders use platens to press the sanding paper into contact with the wood being sanded. The platen sits between two steel rolls which deliver the moving force to the sanding belt. Sanding heads with a platen are used on finish sanding with papers of finer grits, when the coarser ones are typically used with contact drum type sanding heads. Stock is fed into and out of the machine on a conveyor belt. Since the abrasive belt creates a substantial pressure on the stock that tends to push the stock toward the infeed, the hold down shoes and rollers hold the workpiece down against the belt while it is moving through the machine in order to ensure uniform contact with the abrasive and continuous movement.

==== Metal forming ====
In metal forming processes, a platen is the component that houses the mold for forging the required shape. The platen tends to be the heaviest and strongest part of the press due to the massive forces that it has to withstand. A platen for a 5000-ton press can weigh up to 350 tons.

==== Other ====
In manufacturing, a platen is a flat plate of a press utilized in laminate, plastic and forest product industries. A platen is typically heated with oil, water, steam or electricity and is used in the production of furniture, tires, gaskets, particle board, composite heaters and plywood. In high frequency welding products, platens are used to put lines on PVC binders and folders down the spine lines.

Platens are utilized in impact testing in research; a specimen is crushed between platens.

The platen also refers to the fixed part of a linear motor.

== Gallery ==
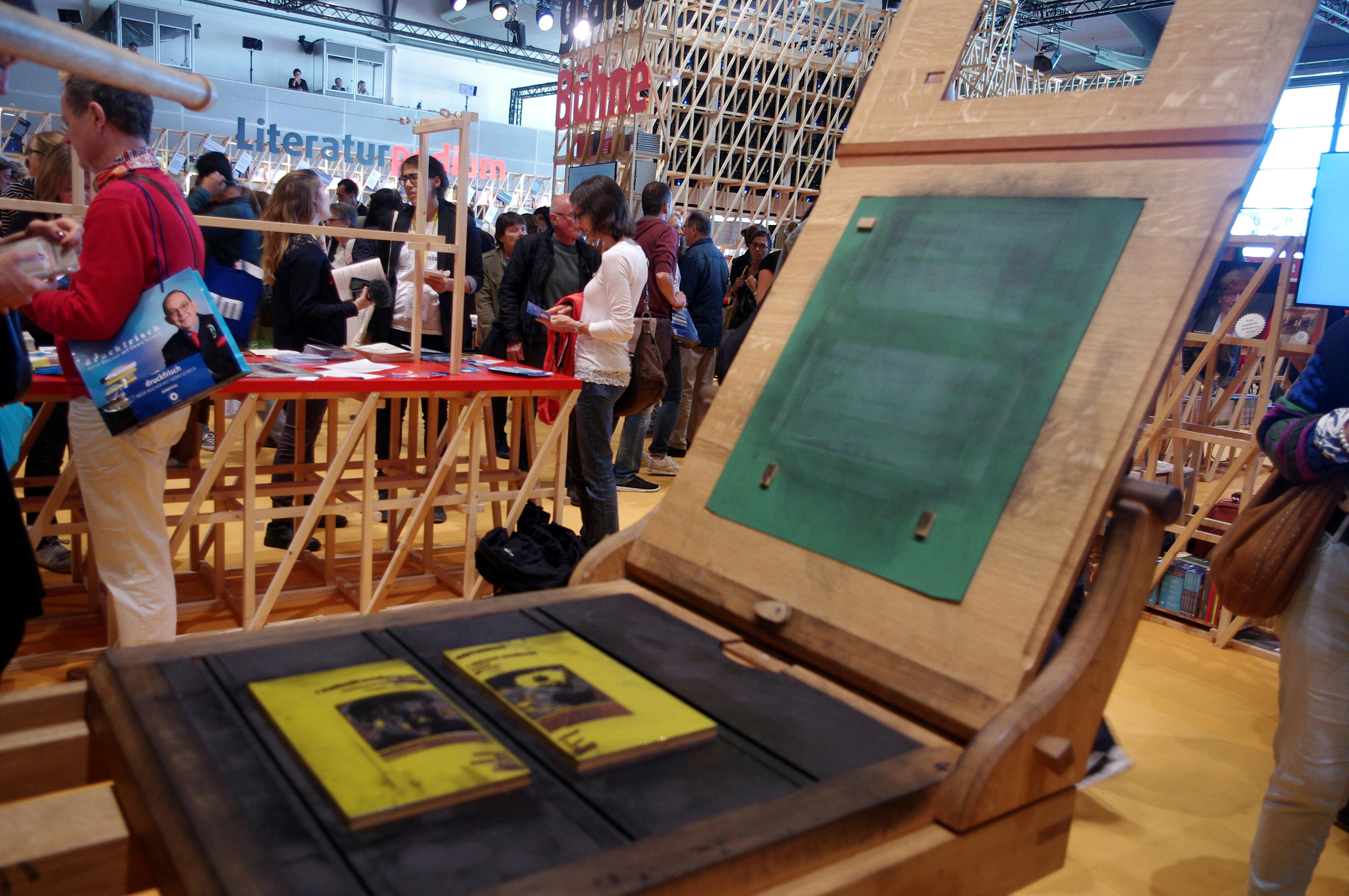
Replica of the Gutenberg press. The platen on the right holds the paper, and is pressed down onto the typeset.

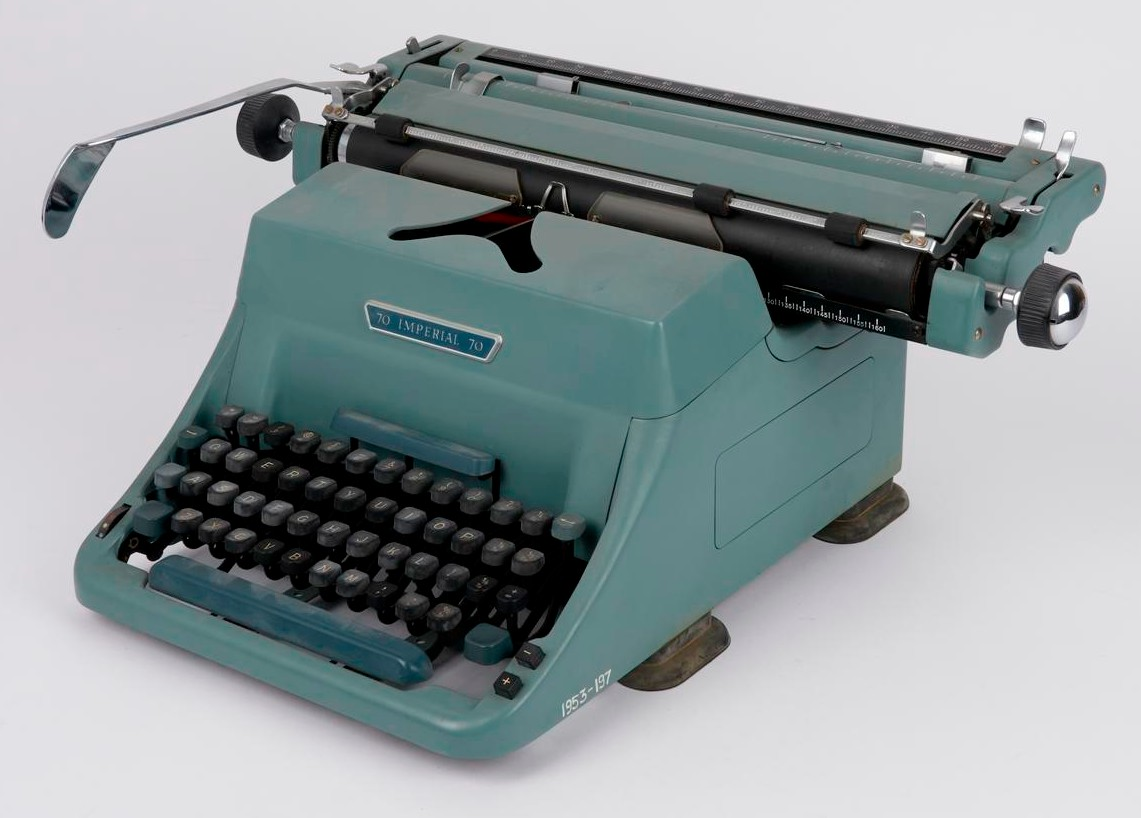
Cylindrical platen on a typewriter

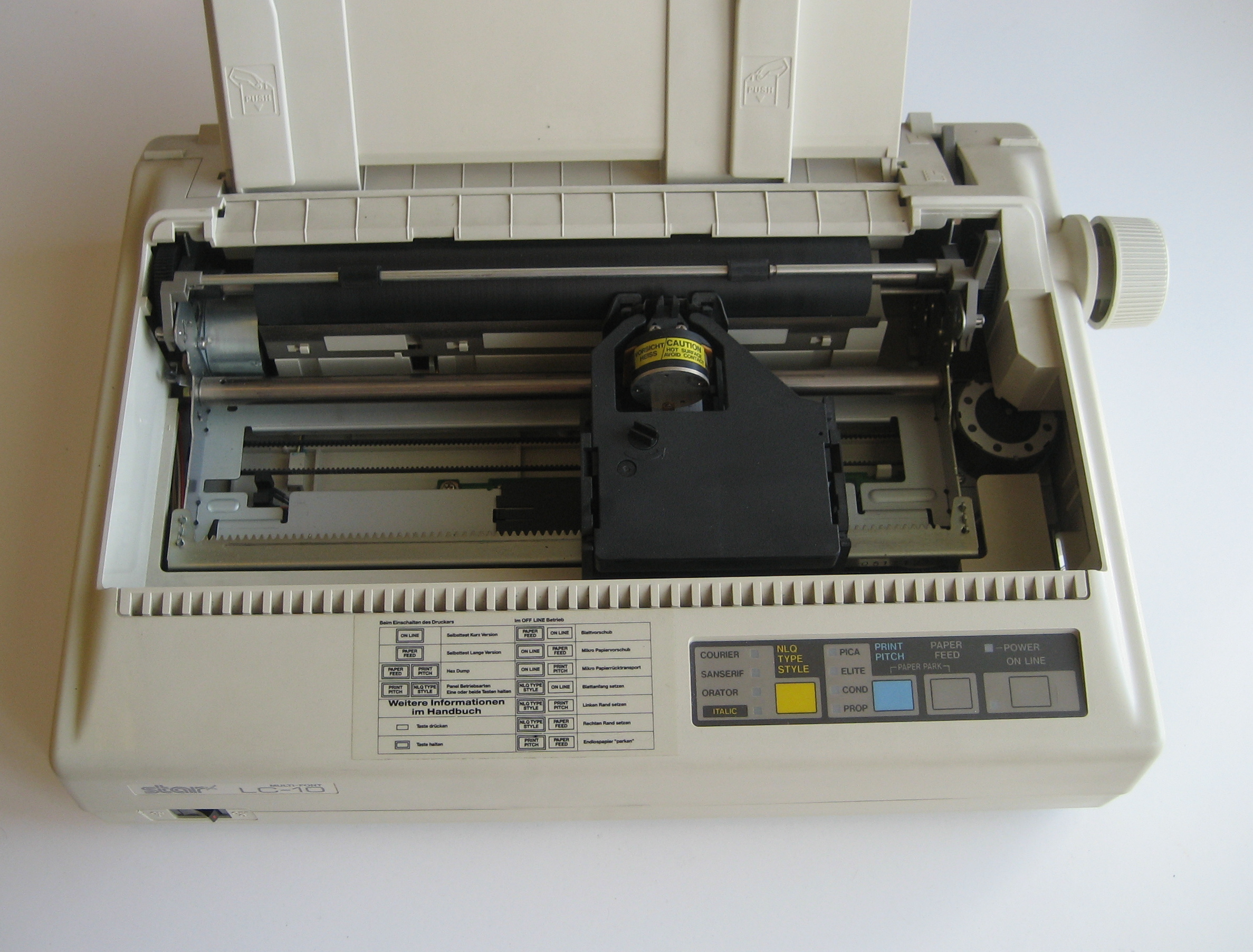
Cylindrical platen in a dot-matrix printer

== See also ==
- Jobbing press
