= Penrith Museum of Printing =

Coordinates: 33.7572°S 150.6884°E

Penrith Museum of Printing Inc.
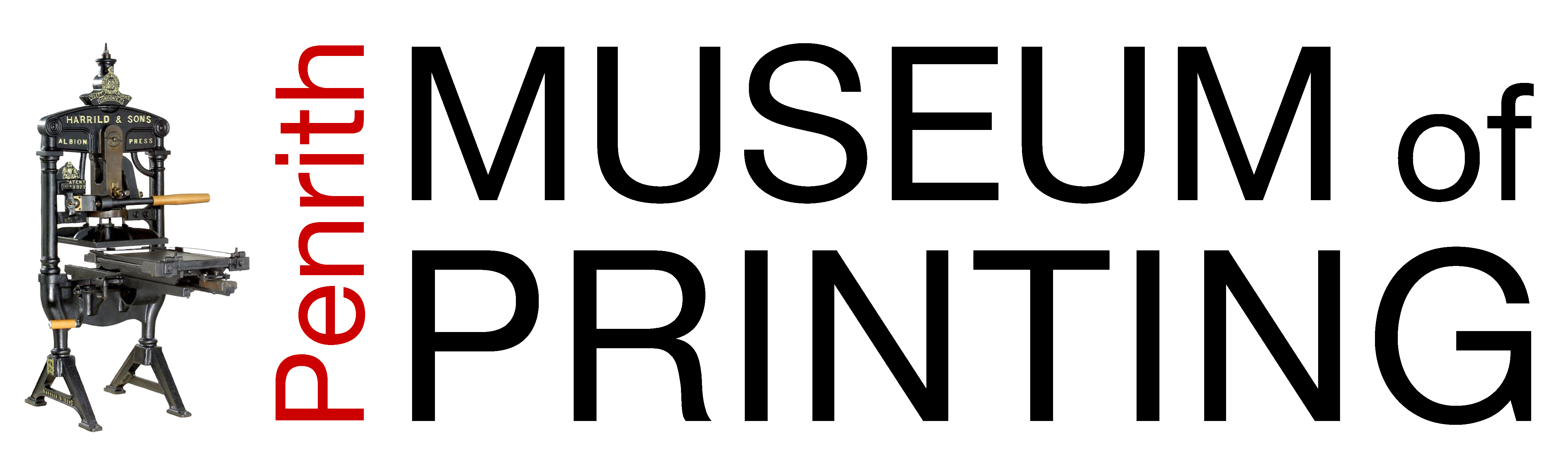

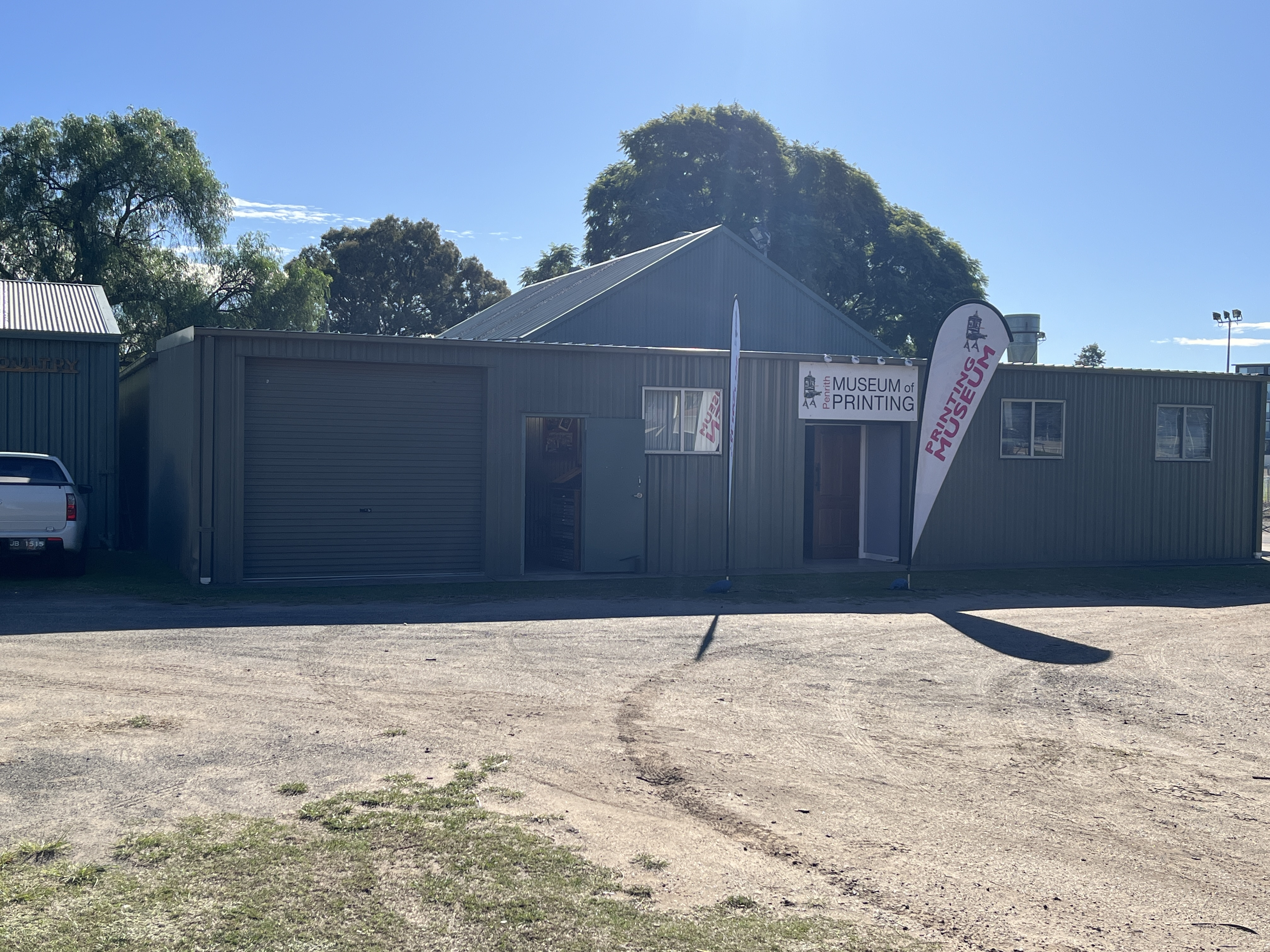
- May 2024
- Established: 2001; 25 years ago
- Location: Ransley St, Penrith, New South Wales 2750 Australia
- Type: Printing museum
- Founder: Alan Connell
- President: Bob Lockley
- Website: www.printingmuseum.org.au

The Penrith Museum of Printing is a museum in Penrith, New South Wales, Australia with a focus on Australian letterpress printing equipment and techniques.

== Establishment ==
In 1987 Alan Connell (1922–2020), a retired employee of the now defunct printing company The Nepean Times, after walking past the building of the old Nepean Times in Station Street, saw that the equipment used the publication of the newspaper were still there, after 25 years of disuse. He asked the then-owner if he could have some of old equipment to preserve the heritage. The machines where stored and other letterpress equipment was added. The Museum was officially opened on 2 June 2001 by Jackie Kelly, MP for Lindsay, the then Minister for Sport and Tourism as well as with the support of industry organisations and a Commonwealth Government Federation Fund Grant.

In September 2017 the Penrith Museum of Printing closed its doors for a major upgrade and added 150 m^{2} to their premises including the addition of a foyer and a library. The $130,000 (AUD) upgrade has given more space to show all working machines and equipment. The museum was reopened by Penrith Councillor Brian Cartwright in November 2018.

== Conservation ==
The Penrith Museum of Printing houses a collection of fully operational letterpress machinery and equipment. A number of the items in the collection are over 150 years old and are still functioning. The objective of the museum is to have all equipment and machinery up and running for all to see and experience. The Penrith Museum of Printing currently has several early 1900 Linotype and Intertype line cast machines, a Columbian press from 1841, a Albion from 1864, the Nepean Times Wharfedale stop cylinder press from around 1880, Chandler & Price, Arab and Pearl treadle presses, Heidelberg platen and a Miehle vertical cylinder press.

The museum featured in the 2018 film Ladies in Black, where it was used to simulate the Sydney Morning Herald's compositors' room.

== List of machines and equipment on display ==
Penrith Museum of Printing
Item	Utilised	Year	Serial Number	Provenance
Linotype model 5	line composing	1902		The NEV after Neville James who restored it. Believed to come from Colin McPherson, NSW, Australia
Linotype model 8	line composing	1922	31963	Nepean Times newspaper 1887–1985, Penrith, NSW, Australia
Intertype C3	line composing	1935	31418	Saxon Press Commercial Printer, Bexley, NSW, Australia
Intertype C4	line composing	1942	27498	Donated by Tony Mercier, Mercier Typesetters and was formally owned by Conte & Ruggier. Used to produce the bilingual French/English newspaper Le Courrier Australien and the French-Australian trade magazine France-Australie
Ludlow	type composing		M16742	
Edwards & Dunlop	proofing press			Sydney, NSW, Australia
Vandercook	proofing press		25458	
Common Press	Wooden hand press	1770		donated by Richard Jermyn Eden, NSW, Australia
Columbian	Hand press	1841	937	Carcoar Chronicle until 1939, donated by Fairfax, NSW, Australia
Albion	Hand press	1864	1644	Donated by Hannanprint, NSW. It was originally owned by Angus & Coote, Jewellers, and used to proof their catalogues before printing until its purchase and restoration by Neil Mulvaney of Champion Press.
Wharfedale	Stop cylinder press	~1880		Nepean Times newspaper, Penrith, NSW, Australia 1887–1962
Chandler & Price	Treadle press			
Arab	Treadle press			
Pearl	Treadle press			Saxon Press Commercial Printer, Bexley, NSW, Australia
Emil Kahle	small hand press	~1910		Gearside, Lithgow, NSW, Australia
Adana (several)	small hand press			
Heidelberg platen	automated press	~1935	31834 E	Saxon Press Commercial Printer, Bexley, NSW, Australia
Heidelberg platen	automated press	1966	T 161604 E	School Graphic Arts, Sydney 1966–2010, Sydney, NSW, Australia
Miele vertical	automated press	1966	V16033	
Gestener Duplicator SP20	duplicator	~1935	25458	Hannanprint, NSW, Australia

== Library ==
The Penrith Museum of Printing has an extensive collection of books, manuals, documents and other letterpress printing artefacts which are all available for viewing.

While the Museum does not loan books or items from its collection, it is open to view and or study this collection during opening hours.

== See also ==
- The Nepean Times
- List of newspapers in Australia
- Museums and Galleries in NSW, Australia
- Isaacs, Victor, Kirkpatrick, Rod and Russell, John (2004). Australian Newspaper History: A Bibliography
