= Charles Wroblewski =

Australian chemist, and newspaper owner

Charles Adam Marie Wroblewski (1855 – 24 July 1936) was an Australian analytical chemist, importer and newspaper owner. Wroblewski was born in Grodno, Russian Empire and died in St Kilda, Victoria.

Wroblewski launched the French language newspaper, Le Courrier Australien, in 1892, and the German language newspaper, Deutsch-Australische Post, in 1893.

== See also ==
- Sir Henry Parkes
- Jean Emile Serisier
