= Columbian press =

Hand-operated printing press

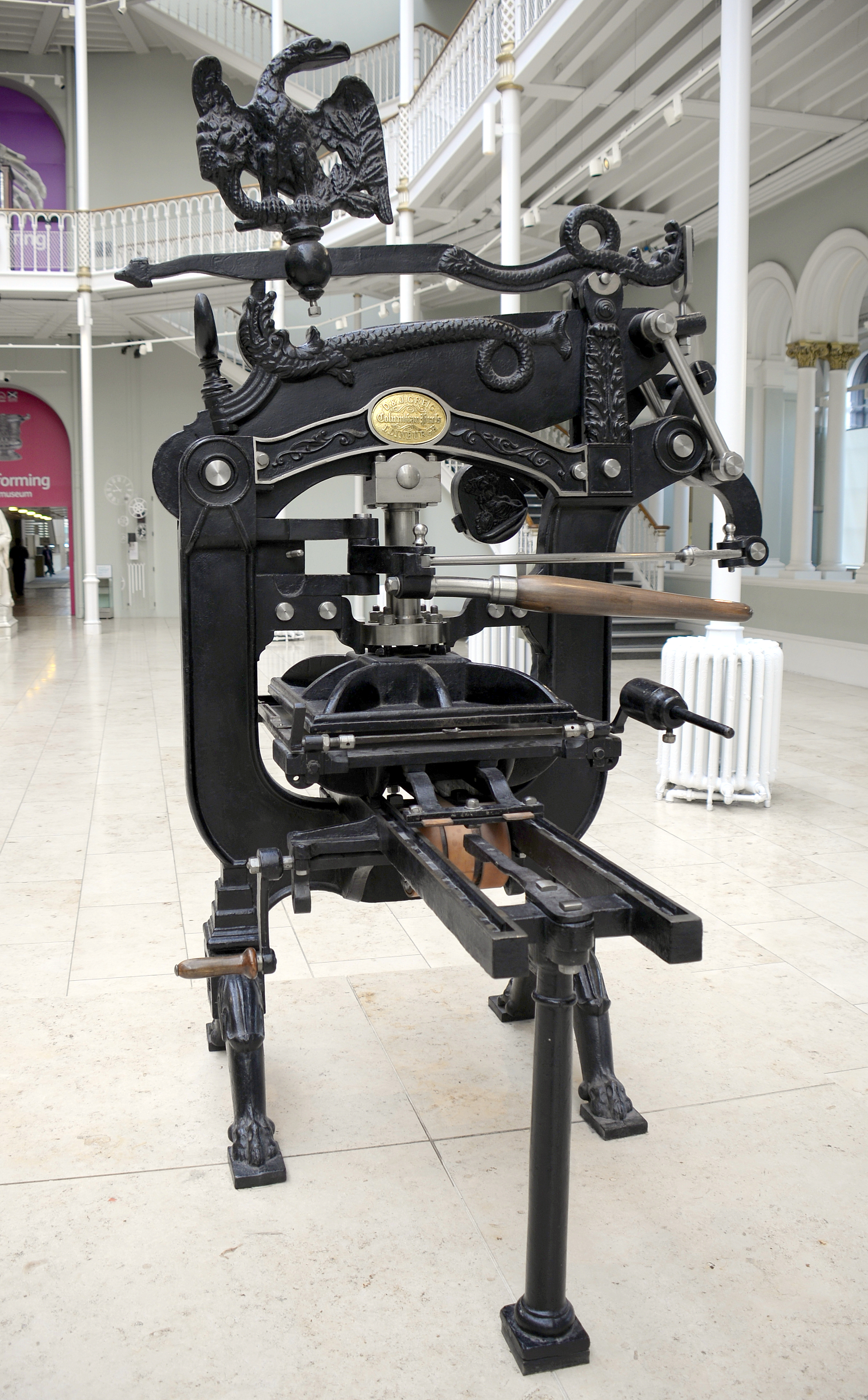
The Columbian press at the National Museum of Scotland, 2015

The Columbian press is a type of hand-operated printing press invented in the United States by George Clymer, around 1813. Made from cast iron, it was a very successful design and many thousands were made by him and by others during the 19th century. Columbians continued to be made as late as the early-20th century, 90 years after their introduction. Despite their age, many are still used for printing, especially by artists who make prints using traditional methods.

The Columbian design is also notable for its elaborate, symbolic ornamentation.

== History ==
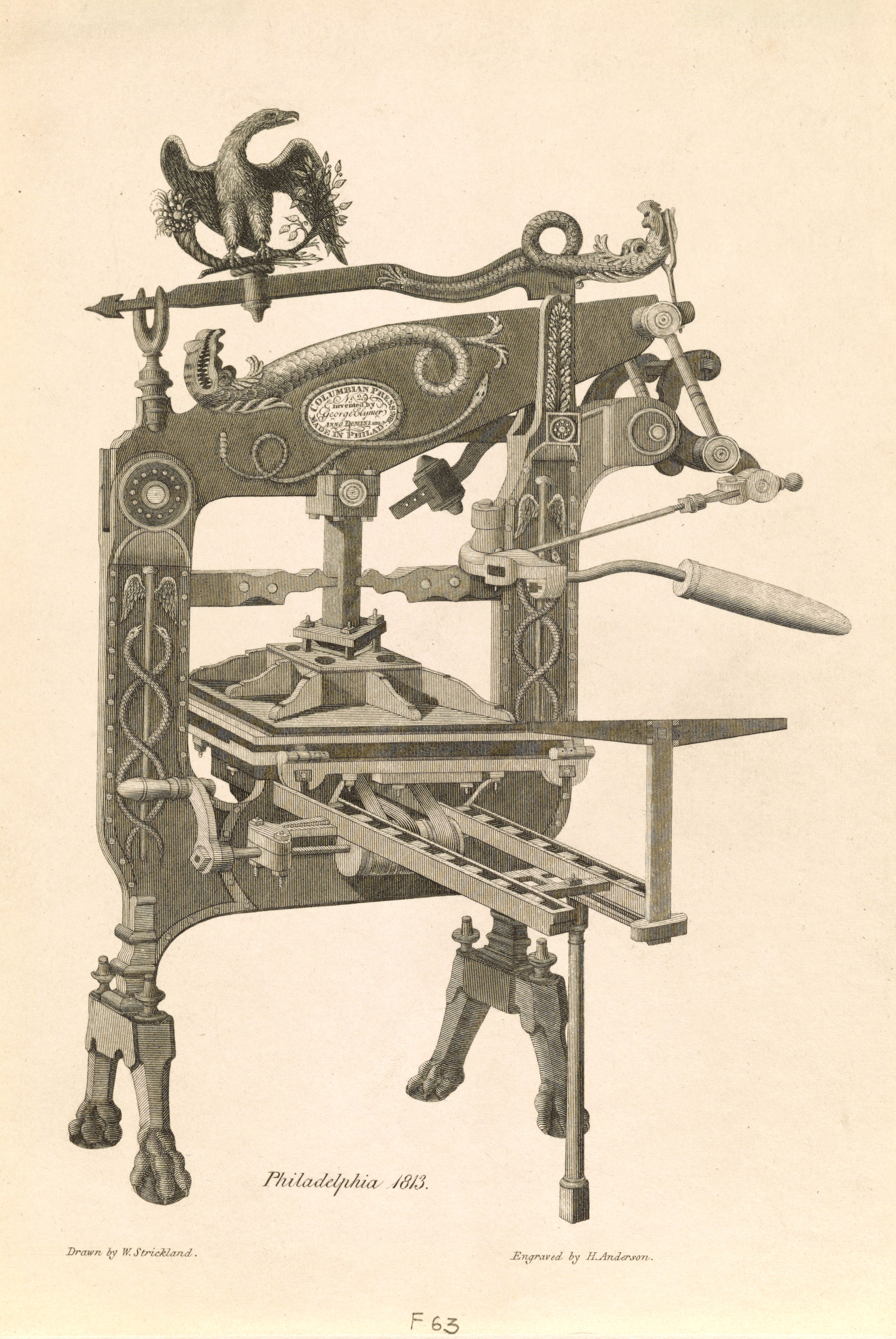
An 1816 illustration of an American-made Columbian press

The Columbian press was inspired in some measure by the earlier Stanhope press. It was designed to allow large formes, such as a broadsheet newspaper page, to be printed at a single pull. The press worked by a lever system, similar to that of the Stanhope press and quite different from the toggle action of the slightly later English Albion press.

George Clymer first began working on improvements to the printing press around 1800 and his new iron press was first advertised in April 1814. However uptake by American printers was limited as his presses sold for $300 to $500 while a conventional press cost around $130. Also the Columbians were heavy, weighing around 1,500 kilograms (3,300 lb). Wooden presses were cheaper, lighter and easier to transport. And unlike the iron Columbian, they could be repaired by anybody with carpentry skills. This made them more attractive to printers outside of major centres.

Despite the disadvantages, newspaper printers in large cities still bought Columbians as they could print more quickly, making them useful for newspapers with large circulations. Newspapers in New York, Philadelphia and Albany bought Columbians; one was used to print the Philadelphia Aurora But this market was limited and it is thought Clymer sold fewer than 25 presses in the United States.

In 1817, Clymer moved to London. He filed a patent for his invention in November of that year, and began manufacturing presses in premises at 1 Finsbury Street in 1818. In Britain, Clymer's presses cost between £100 and £125, depending on the paper size they printed. But he later reduced prices to between £75 and £85. Among the early adopters were Andrew Strahan, the King's Printer, and Abraham John Valpy, who were both using the presses by 1818. Clymer's early advertisements describe the press as especially suitable for printing newspapers. An 1825 news item describes a Columbian press as among the items sold when a Dublin newspaper was closed and its property auctioned for failing to pay stamp duty.

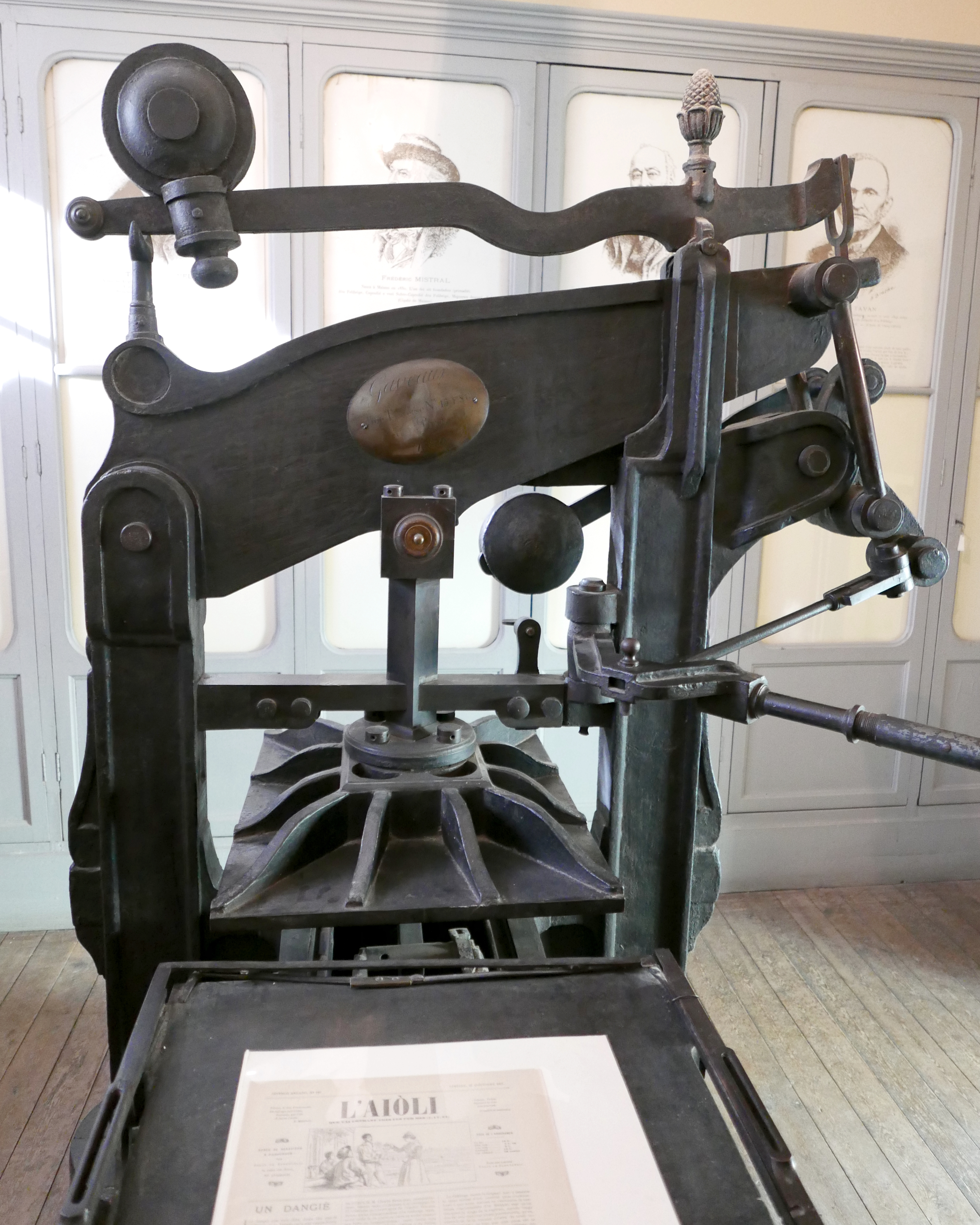
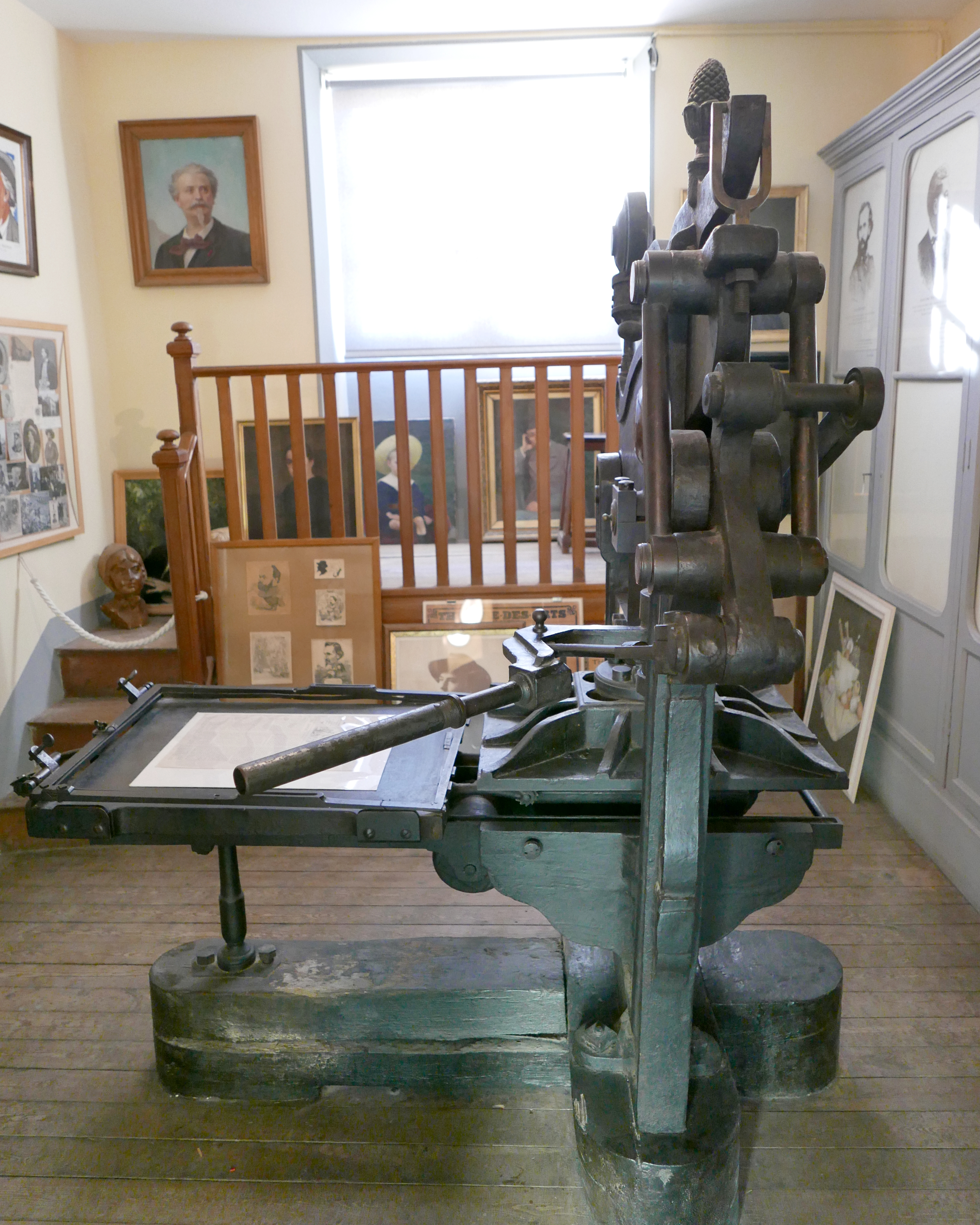
A Columbian-type press with simplified decoration and mounted on a wooden base. Used by the French poet Joseph Roumanille in the early 1860s. Palais du Roure, Avignon, France, 2019

In 1830, Clymer formed a partnership with Samuel Dixon. The company moved to new premises at 10 Finsbury Street and traded under the name of Clymer and Dixon.

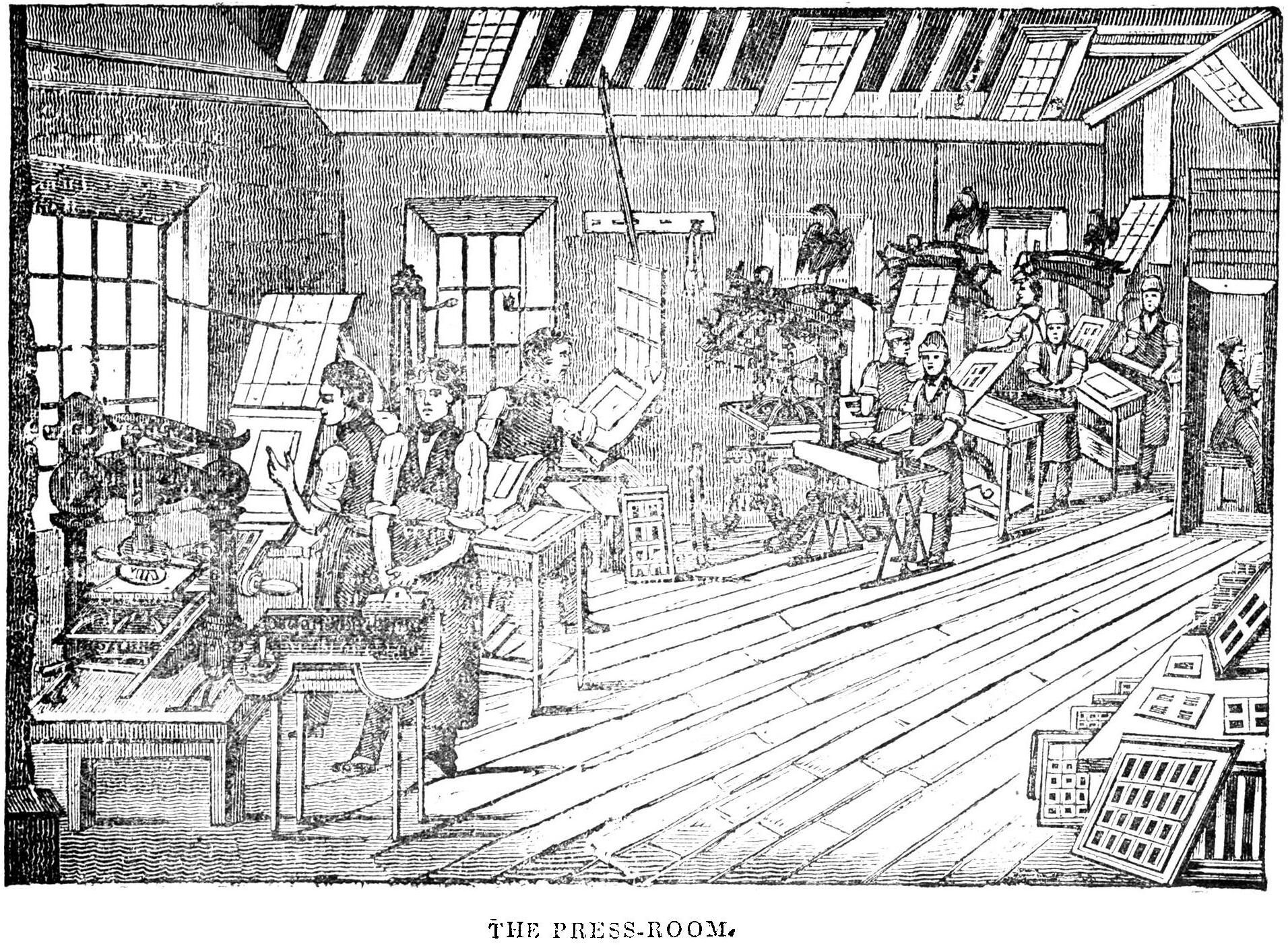
Presses installed at the Dublin Penny Journal, 1834

In 1834, George Clymer died but Dixon continued to make presses. He was later joined with other partners and the company traded under the name of Clymer, Dixon and Co. The business was taken over in 1851 by William Carpenter, and in 1856 by Edward Bevan and Co. Production continued until the company closed in 1863.

Meanwhile, other manufacturers made Columbian presses under license, with at least one company in Germany making unlicensed versions. More companies began making them after Clymer's patent expired. The presses were sold with different sizes of platen to accommodate different sizes of paper. (Note: These included Quarto - 7 by 10 inches (18 by 25 cm); Double Demy - 24 by 36 in (61 by 91 cm); Double Royal - 25 by 40 in (64 by 102 cm) and Extra Size - 27 by 42 in (69 by 107 cm)) Around 40 companies in eight countries are known to have made Columbian presses. Mostly, the design saw little modification or improvement although some makers in Continental Europe altered or simplified the ornamentation and some mounted their presses on a wooden base rather than a cast-iron one.

Production continued for many decades - surviving trade catalogues show Columbians were still available for sale in 1906 as printers still found them useful for printing proofs - initial test prints of a publication. Some were still being used in this role as late as the 1970's.

== Decoration ==
The press is sometimes referred to as the "Eagle press" due to the characteristic, cast-iron bald eagle on the top lever which represents the United States. The eagle weights around 50 pounds (23 kg) and functions as a counterweight, acting to raise the platen from the paper after a print has been made.

The eagle clutches in one talon a cornucopia, representing prosperity and plenty. The other clutches an olive branch, representing peace. Illustrations of the earliest presses show the eagle also clutching thunderbolts of Jupiter, but these are not present on any examples that survive.

The side columns of the press are decorated with a Caduceus, the symbol of Hermes the messenger of the gods in Greek mythology. This alludes to the role of the printing press in the dissemination of knowledge. The symbol was a printer's mark for a number of early printers. There is a secondary counterweight that carries a figure of a woman in flowing robes with an anchor, this was an emblem known as the "Hope and Anchor".

The serpent-like creatures on the press' levers are intended to be depictions of dolphins. They may represent wisdom or knowledge. Also, the dolphin was the mark of the famous early book printer, the Aldine Press. The large main lever also carries a cartouche of flowers and fruit around an engraved, brass maker's plate. The legs of the press rest on claw-and-ball feet.

These decorative elements were altered by some manufacturers. For example, some presses sold in France had the eagle replaced with a globe or a lion as the eagle was a contentious political symbol in the post-Napoleonic era. Some presses replaced the Hope and Anchor symbol with a figure of Britannia.

Decoration on different presses at various museums

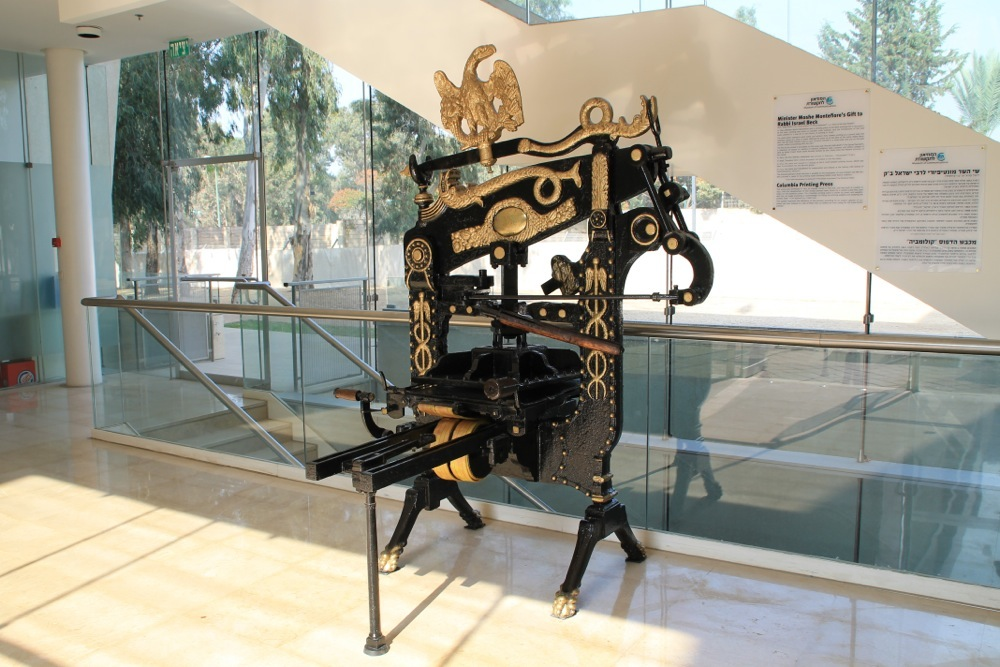
Reichman University, Israel, 2013. The decorative elements have been highlighted in gold

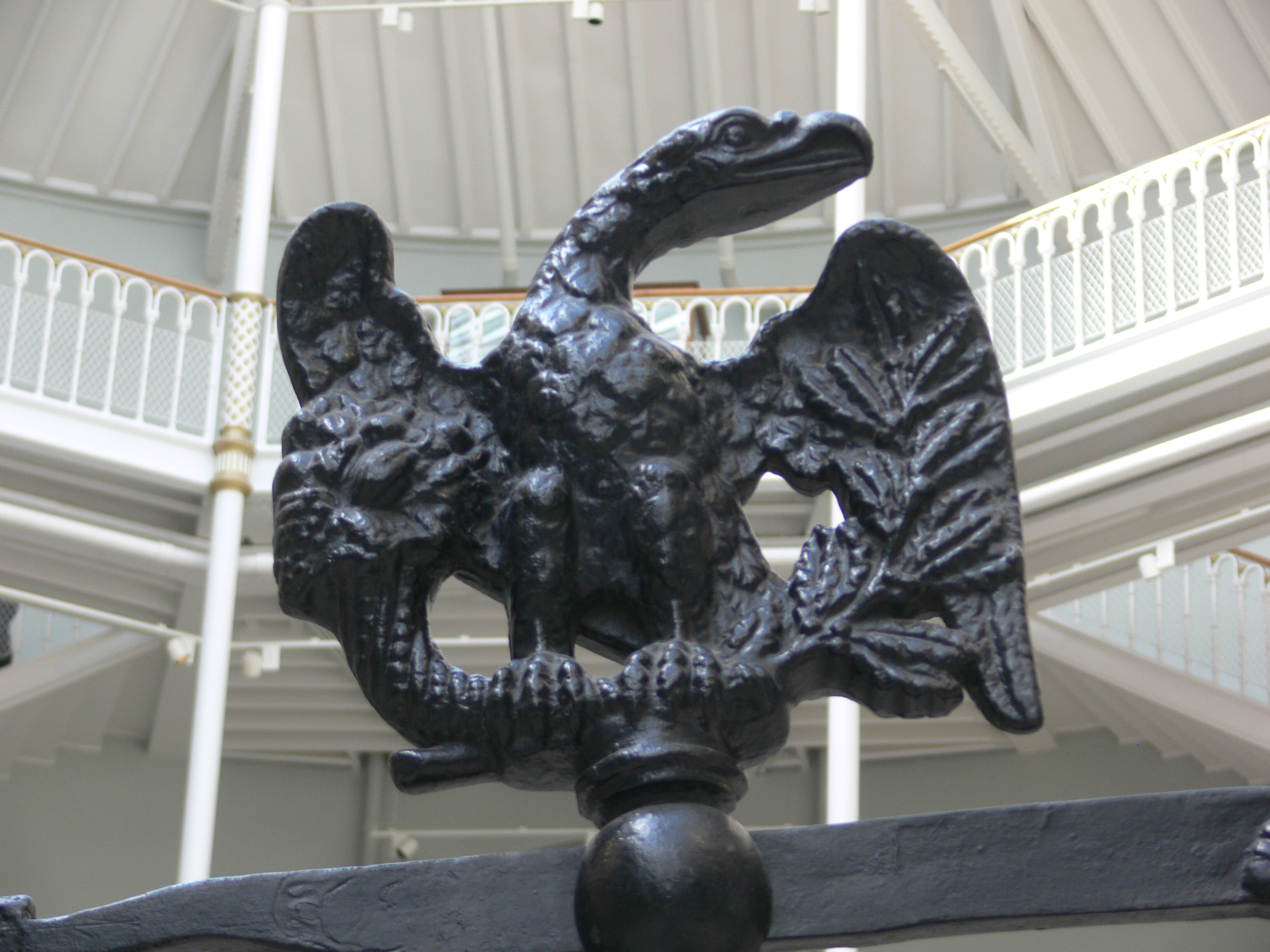
The eagle, National Museum of Scotland

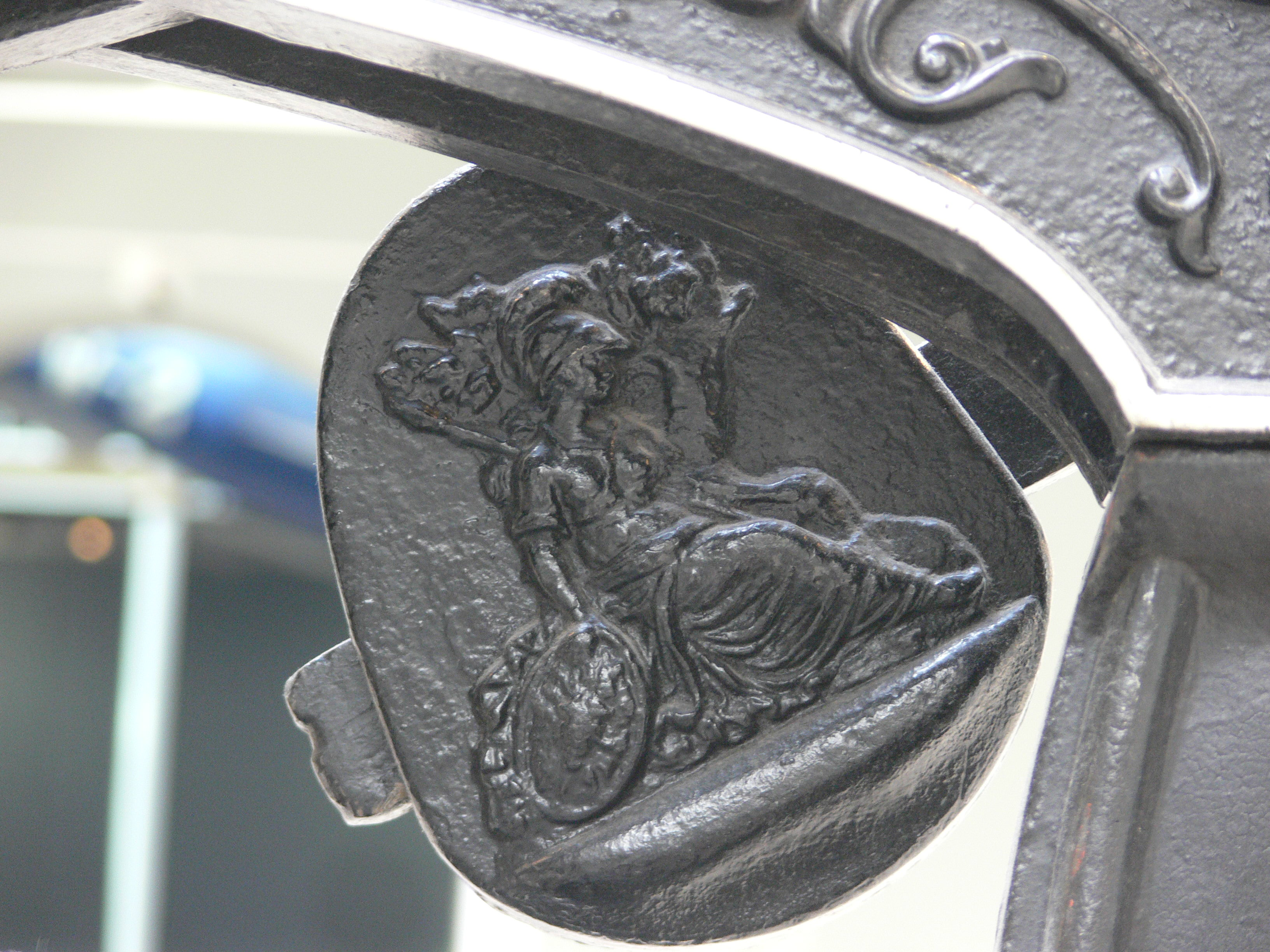
Britannia, National Museum of Scotland

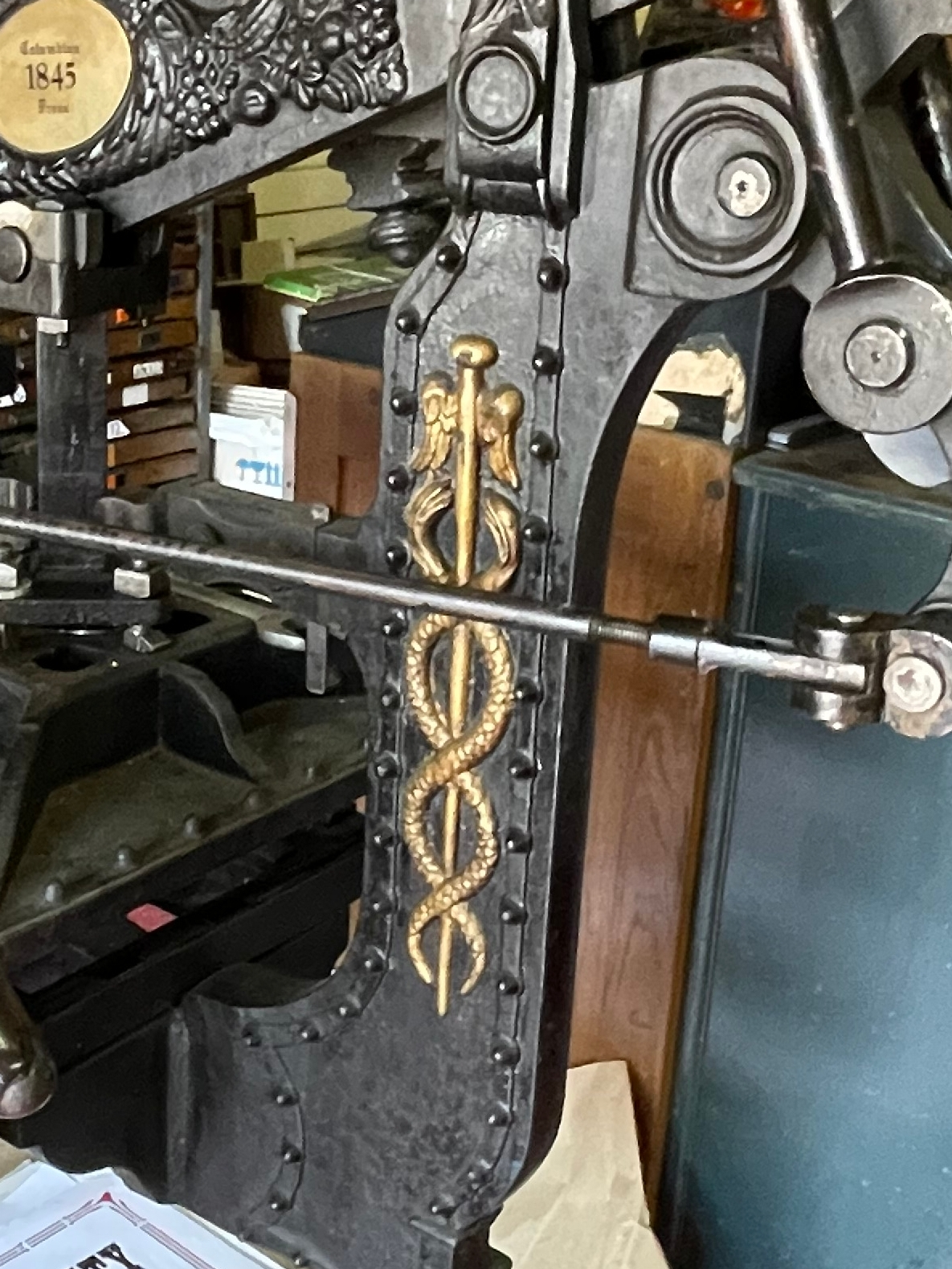
The Caduceus, Norwich Printing Museum

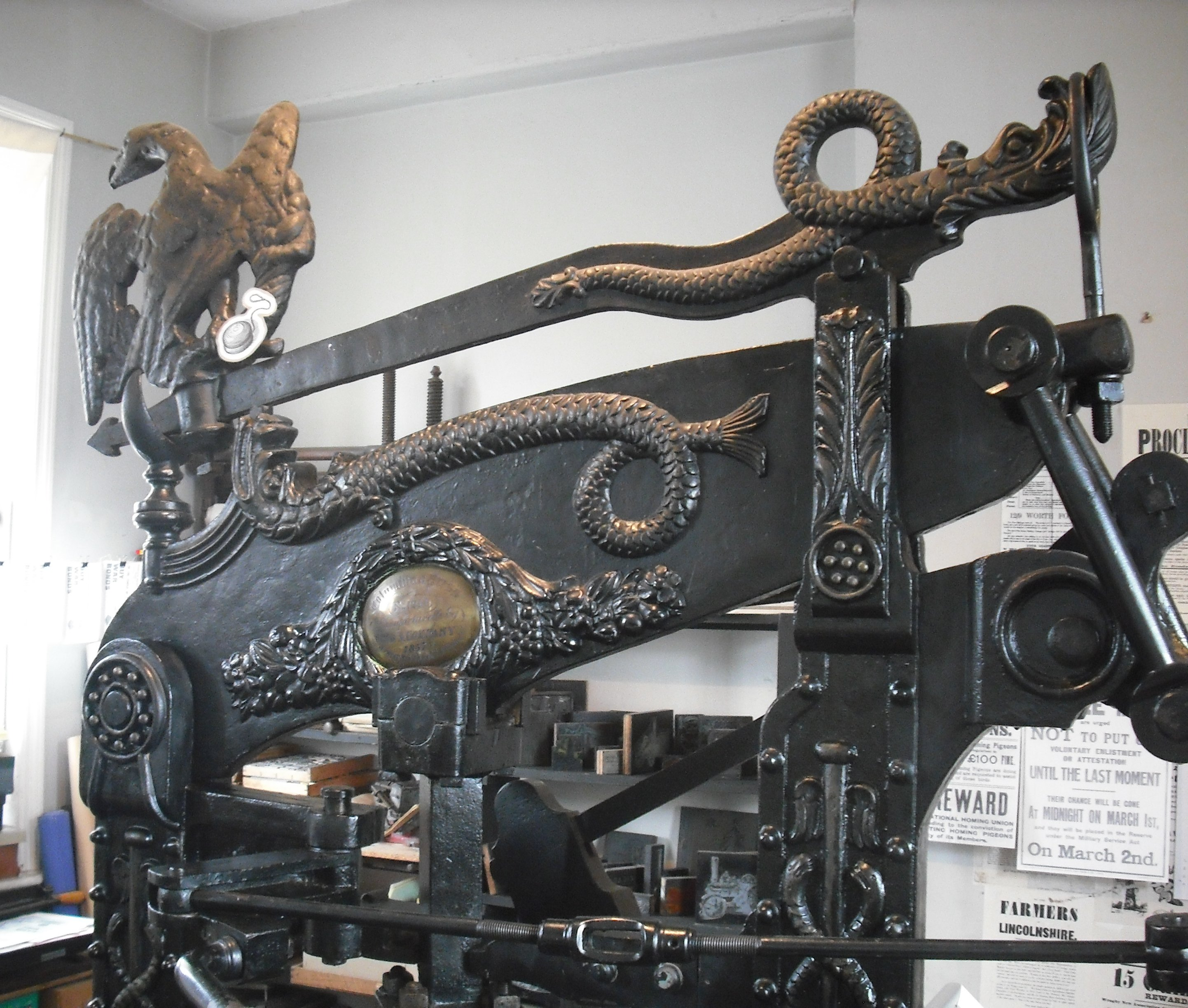
Museum of Lincolnshire Life, showing the eagle, the dolphins, the maker's plate with its cartouche, and an Acanthus leaf

Columbian printing Press Mathrubhumi Thiruvananthapuram

== Surviving examples ==
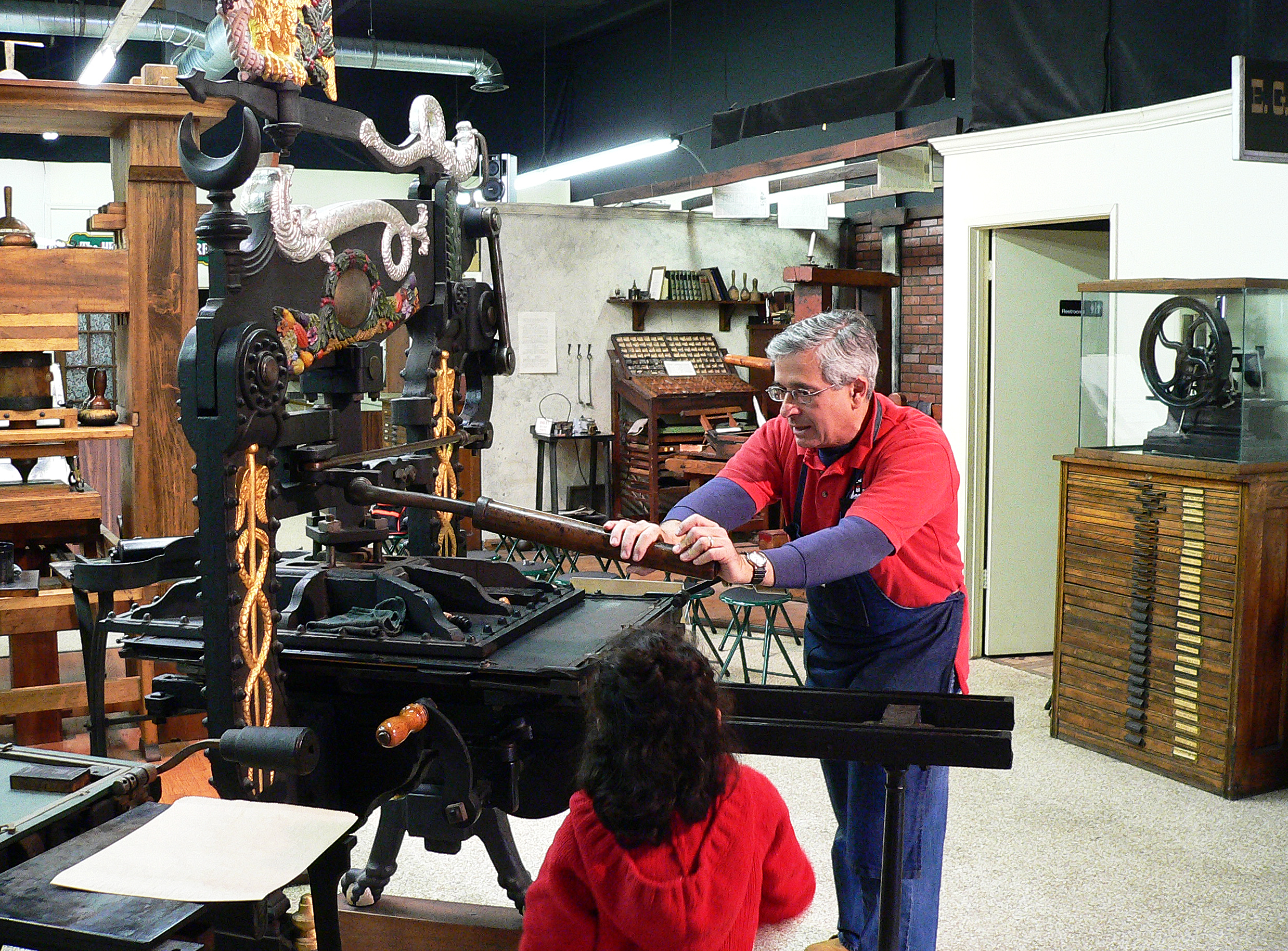
One of the Columbian presses at the International Printing Museum being demonstrated to a student, 2009

Of the thousands made, 415 surviving presses were recorded in a world-wide census compiled between 2013 and 2017. Examples of Columbian presses can be currently found in 29 countries. Around half of the presses are in the United Kingdom. Some are still in use by artists using the linocut or woodcut methods for printmaking.

None of Clymer's earliest, American-made presses are thought to survive. There are around 40 surviving presses made during Clymer's lifetime. The majority are presses made by other companies after Clymer's patents expired.

Many museums and other institutions own a Columbian press, some of which are still used. Examples include:

- Cary Graphic Arts Collection at the Rochester Institute of Technology, Rochester, New York. The collection holds a Columbian press made in England in 1876, which remains in use by the university.
- Printmac Corporation, Paul Carthew has the world's oldest Columbian press dated 1818 (Number 10). Believed to have been cast in US and transported to UK when George Clymer migrated in 1817.
- Howard Iron Works Printing Museum, Oakville, Ontario, Canada. This museum has one of the largest collections of Columbian presses in North America, including one made in 1845.
- Georgian Bay School of the Arts, Owen Sound, Ontario, Canada. This not-for-profit school has Columbian press #1957 in use in its printmaking department.
- International Printing Museum, Los Angeles County, California. This museum has three Columbian presses, including ones made in 1824 and 1838.
- Leicester Print Workshop, a registered charity and art studio in the United Kingdom. Their 1838 Columbian press is among the facilities available for use by artists.
- McGill University Library, Montreal. The library displays an 1821 example, the oldest Columbian in North America. The press was used until 1965.
- National Museum of American History (Smithsonian), an 1860 example made by Ritchie and Sons, Edinburgh, Scotland.
- National Museum of Scotland, a circa 1865 example made by D. and J. Greig of Edinburgh. This was originally bought new from the manufacturer for use by the museum's print shop. It was retired in 1964 and transferred to the museum's collection.
- Museum of New Zealand Te Papa Tongarewa, a Clymer and Dixon press made in England in 1841. It was sent to New Zealand in 1842 by the Church Mission Society. It was gifted to the museum in 1974.
- Museum of Printing, Haverhill, Massachusetts. The collection includes an 1886 model, which is demonstrated from time to time.
- Penrith Museum of Printing, Australia, number 937 made in 1841.
- Printing Museum, Tokyo, this press is still used to demonstrate printing to visitors.
- Pickering Beck Isle Museum, North Yorkshire. An 1854 press that is still used for demonstrations to visitors.
- Science Museum, London, number 785 made by Clymer and Dixon in 1837.
- Ulster Folk Museum, Northern Ireland. The museum owns a working example that is displayed in a recreated print-shop.
- Ziegenbalg House museum, Tharangambadi India; this press remains in use.
- Imprensa Nacional, in Brazil. It is no longer in operation but is part of the collection at the Imprensa Nacional Museum in Brasília (Distrito Federal).
