= International Printing Museum =

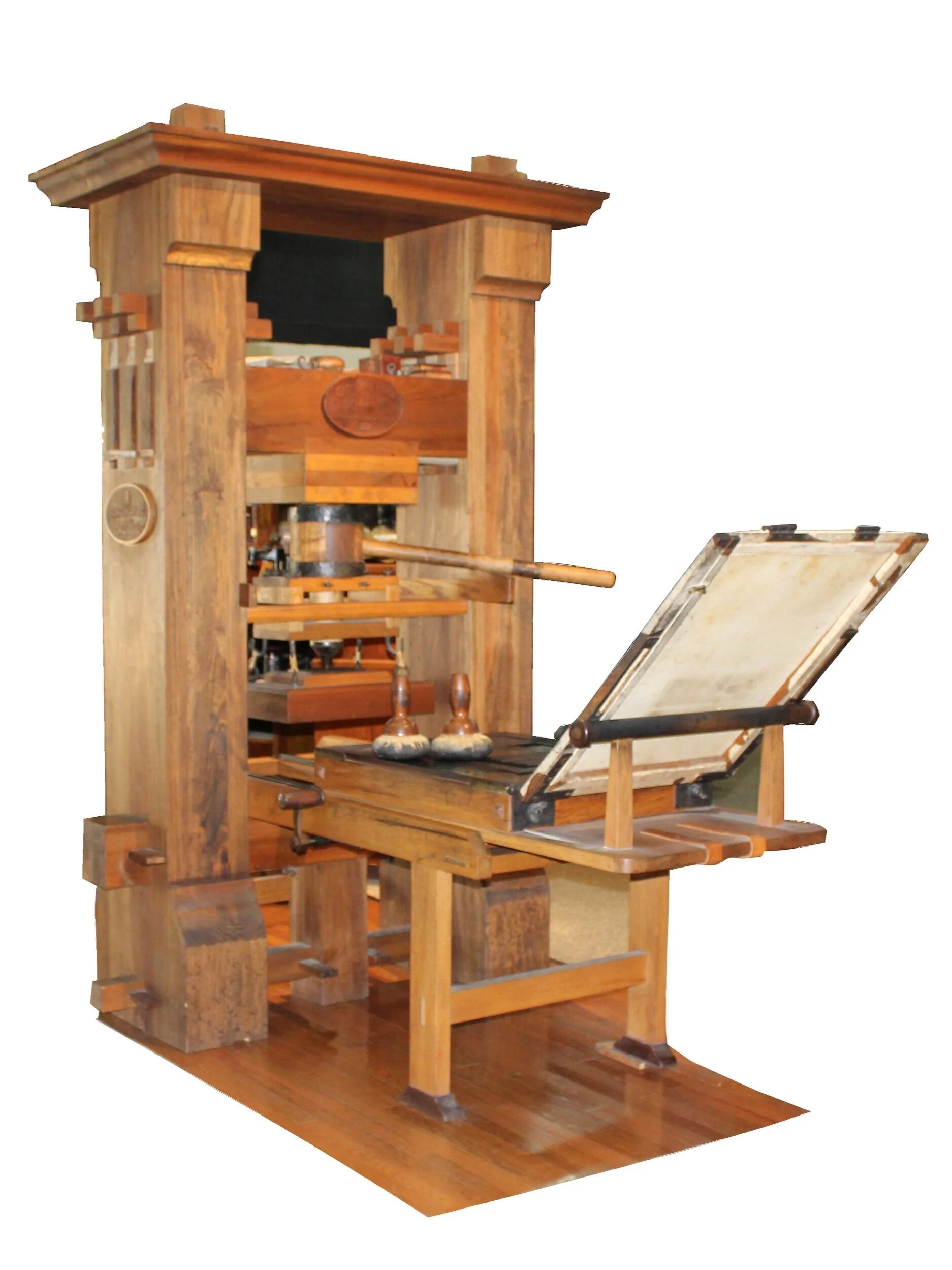
- The museum's Gutenberg press.
- Established: 1988
- Location: 315 W. Torrance Blvd. Carson, California
- Coordinates: 33.842368°N 118.282264°W
- Type: Media museum
- Website: http://www.printmuseum.org/

The International Printing Museum has one of the largest collections of antique printing presses in the United States. It offers educational programs for school groups at the museum, and also has a Ben-Franklin-type printing press on a trailer that travels to schools and public events for living history programs.

Located in the Los Angeles suburbs, the museum consults for Hollywood and has provided rentals of vintage printing presses for numerous television and movie productions.

== History and collection ==
David Jacobson of Gutenberg Expositions and collector Ernest A. Lindner started the museum in 1988 to house the Lindner collection of antique printing machinery. The collection has grown with significant donations and acquisitions under the leadership of the museum's board of trustees and its founding curator and executive director, Mark Barbour.

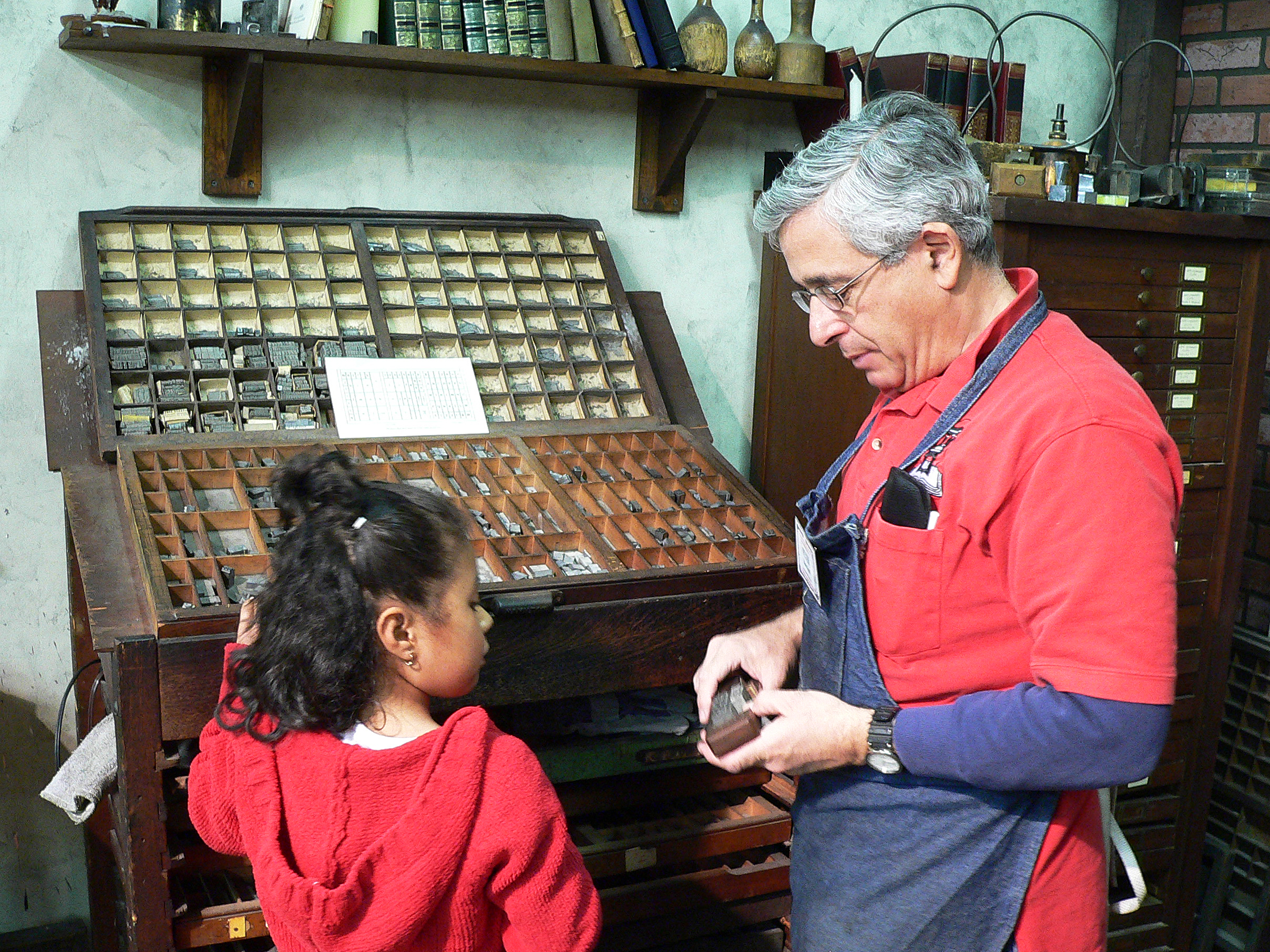
Peter Small showing a student how Ben Franklin set type by hand.

The museum's collection includes a replica Gutenberg press. Gutenberg's invention of movable type was rated by Time magazine as one of the most important developments of the millennium. Prior to his invention, ordinary people could not afford to own a book. With the efficiencies created by Gutenberg, printing costs dropped dramatically, and book ownership became common in Europe. People could now buy their own Bible, and interpret it themselves, rather than have to rely on their priest or minister. This led to people thinking for themselves as well, which led to the Protestant Reformation, the Enlightenment, and democracy.

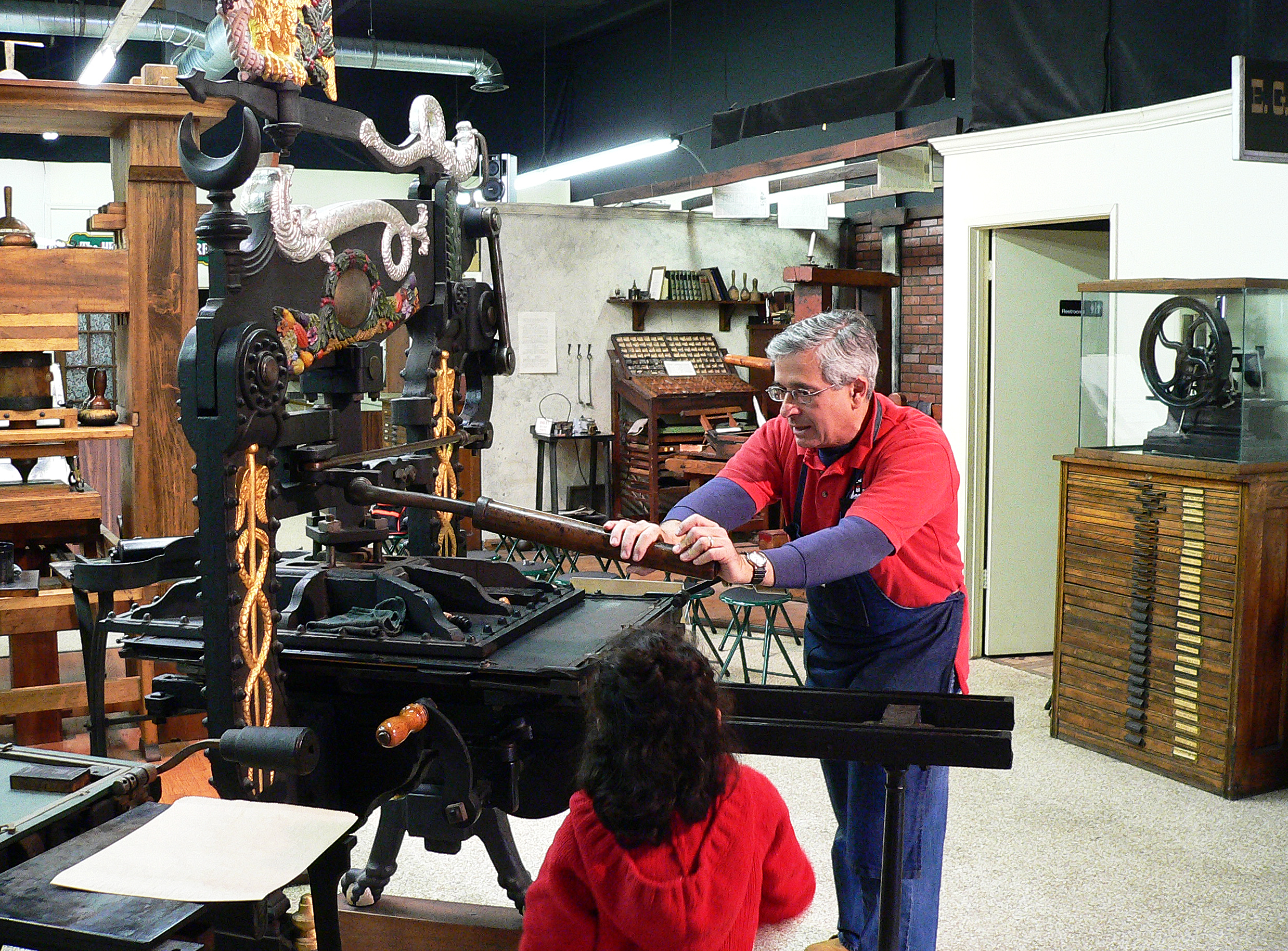
One of the museum's early 19th century Columbian presses being demonstrated

The museum also has the third oldest printing press made in America, which was referred to 200 years ago as a "common press," which is what Ben Franklin used in his business as a printer. Franklin had little formal education, but honed his skills with language as a printer's apprentice. He made his living as an adult as a printer, publishing the Pennsylvania Gazette and Poor Richard's Almanack, and was quite proud of his occupation. Even when being introduced to royalty in Europe, he wouldn't refer to all his scientific or political accomplishments - he would simply say, "I am Benjamin Franklin, a printer."

The collection includes printing presses from the age of Mark Twain, who also had little formal education but gained knowledge as a printer's apprentice for the Hannibal Journal. Later, he was an editor/reporter for the Virginia City Territorial Enterprise and other publications. Numerous Linotype machines, and other presses and related newspaper machinery are also housed in the museum.

The museum is a "working museum," in which much of the equipment — as much as is practical — is kept in working order, and is actually used, both for its own official printed materials and for personal projects by staff and docents, in full view of any visitors who happen to be present. Interested students can also take classes in the safe operation of various letterpress equipment, again, in full view of any visitors who might be present. This helps to fulfill the museum's ongoing mission, and Lindner's vision, of being a place where visitors can not only see vintage printing equipment, but see how it is used.

== Programs ==
The museum hosts the annual Los Angeles Printers Fair every first Saturday of October as well as numerous school programs and special events, including the following:

- The Inventive Ben Franklin
- Franklin's Colonial Assembly
- Constitutional Convention Tour
- The Dickens Holiday Celebration
- Franklin Gallery Tour
- Book Arts Tour
- Book Arts and Printing Classes
- Scout Merit Badge Program
- L.A. Printers Fair

The museum also has a trailer which houses a Ben-Franklin-type press which is used to take the museum's living history programs to schools and public events.
