= The Nepean Times =

Former Australian weekly newspaper

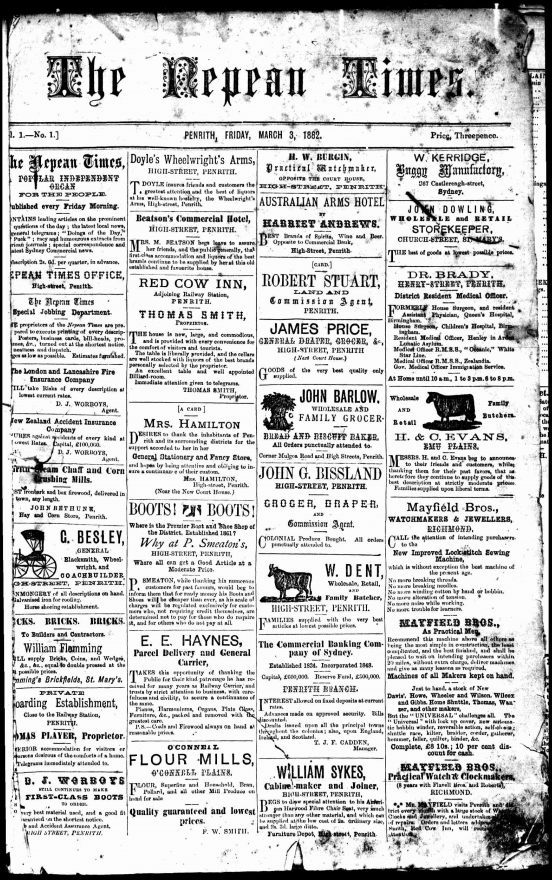
- The Nepean Times 3 March 1882
- Type: Weekly newspaper
- Format: Broadsheet
- Owner(s): Colless Family
- Publisher: Alfred Colless
- Editor: (vacant)
- Founded: 1882
- Ceased publication: 1962
- Headquarters: Station Street Penrith, New South Wales, Australia
- Website: Penrith City Library Catalogue

The Nepean Times was a weekly newspaper first published in the Australian city of Penrith, New South Wales on 3 March 1882.

== History ==
The Nepean Times was a weekly newspaper published by the Colless family in Penrith, New South Wales, Australia which ran from 1882 to 1962. Alfred Colless a local city councillor who ran a general store as well as a real estate and auctioneering business, established the paper. Initially published every Saturday the ‘popular independent organ for the people’ sold for threepence for most of its eighty years of existence and was the only local newspaper for most of its 80 years in publication. The newspaper was published every Saturday until 13 August 1936 when it changed to a Thursday publication day.

Up until the establishment of a locally produced newspaper in the Penrith district, Sydney and Parramatta newspapers, such as the Evening News, Cumberland Mercury and Sydney Morning Herald circulated in the local area and carried local news reports. The first newspaper published in Penrith was the short-lived Penrith Argus which commenced in 1881. Newspaper proprietor, William Webb, who was born in the district, had by the 1880s established a number of country papers. He set up his apprentice, a young William Shannon Walker as editor.

The Nepean Times was circulated from Rooty Hill (Blacktown) to Springwood (Blue Mountains), Castlereagh to Bringelly.

When the Nepean Times ceased publication after eighty years on 29 November 1962, it was not without a great deal of recognition of its lasting importance. It was the only newspaper owned, printed & published in Penrith at the time.

== Awards ==
In 1952, the high standards set by the Nepean Times newspaper was recognised when it was awarded the W.O. Richards Trophy by the NSW Country Press Association for the best weekly newspaper in New South Wales.

== Conservation ==
The Nepean Times original hardcopy is bound and kept within Penrith City Library. A microfilm copy has been produced for public access both at Penrith Library and the State Library of NSW.

The original Nepean Times "Wharfedale printing press" is conserved by the Penrith Museum of Printing.

== Digitisation ==
The issues of this paper from 1914 – 1920 have been digitised as part of the Australian Newspapers Digitisation Program project of the National Library of Australia.

== See also ==
- Cumberland Argus (Parramatta, covering Parramatta and surrounding districts – 1950–1962)
- The Cumberland Argus and Fruitgrowers' Advocate (Parramatta, covering Greater Western Sydney – 1887–1950)
- List of newspapers in Australia
- List of newspapers in New South Wales
