= Museum of Printing =

Graphic arts museum in Haverhill, MA, US since 1978

Coordinates: 42°46′22.01″N 71°7′15.31″W

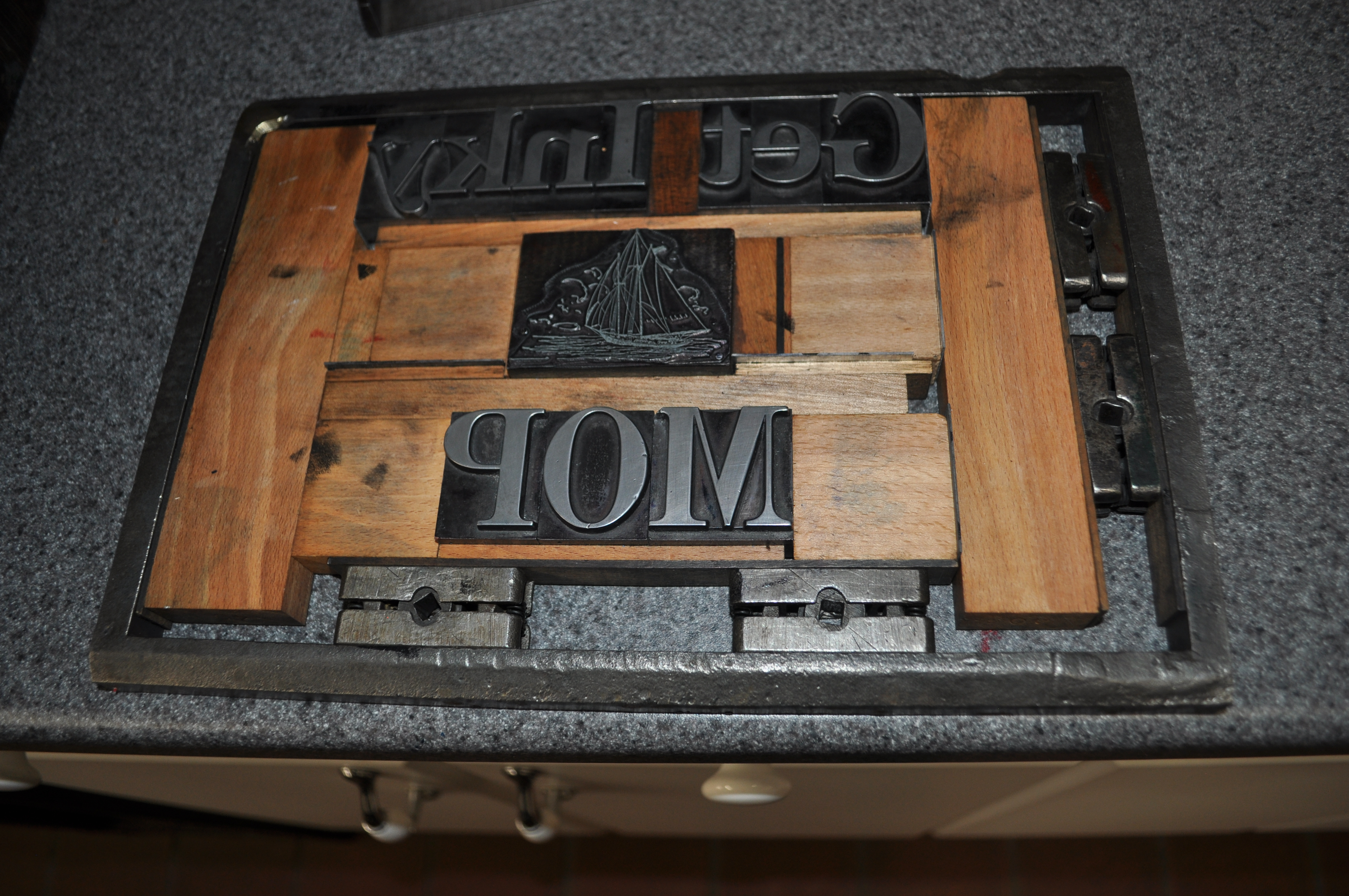
- Classic small printshop typebed setup
- Established: 1978
- Location: Haverhill, Massachusetts, US
- Type: History of technology
- Executive director: Frank Romano
- Website: www.museumofprinting.org

The Museum of Printing (MoP), located in Haverhill, Massachusetts, is a museum dedicated to preserving the history of printing technologies and practices, the graphic arts, and their role in the development of culture and literacy.

== History ==
In 1978, a group of New England printers and publishers mobilized to preserve hot metal typesetting equipment which was being replaced by the Boston Globe newspaper. For the first 18 years, the growing collection was dispersed in various warehouses and spaces inaccessible to the public. In 1997, some of the collection was first opened to view in space formerly occupied by the Textile Museum in North Andover, Massachusetts. In 2016, Rochester Institute of Technology Professor Emeritus Frank Romano acquired and donated a former electrical supplies building in Haverhill, Massachusetts to house the museum.

The core of the collection was contributed by Romano, who spent his career in the development of the modern printing business. He contributed 6,000 books from his personal library, plus many classic machines, including early Macintosh desktop publishing computers contributed by Steve Jobs.

The typewriter collection has been the setting and facilitator of at least one successful marriage proposal, in 2020.

== Collection ==
The displays include a number of historic machines and related artifacts:

- Early Gutenberg-style hand-powered printing presses, progressing to small hand-operated presses used in the early 20th century
- Linotype "hot metal" typecasting machine
- Xerox 914 photocopier, mimeographs, spirit duplicators, and blueprint copiers
- Typewriters, including composing typewriters such as the IBM Selectric Composer
- A complex mechanical Chinese typewriter with thousands of characters
- Photolithography and hand-engraving equipment
- Bindery, finishing, and mailing equipment
- A full-size drum scanner
- Phototypesetters (claimed to be the largest collection in the world)
- Desktop publishing setups such as the original Apple Macintosh and Laserwriter printer
- Various data storage media used with printing, such as magnetic tape, floppy disks, and specialized optical cartridges
- Many different metal, optical, digital, and wood typefonts, including over 2500 wooden display fonts

There is an extensive library of 7,000 books, periodicals, and media related to the history of paper and printing.

== Programs ==
Operation of classic printing equipment is demonstrated, as well as exhibitions and hands-on workshops by artists who use printing technologies. In 2018, the museum celebrated a "QWERTY" Festival, featuring typewriters and their history and culture.

There are art galleries, meeting spaces, and a museum store on premises. The store offers books, souvenirs, and classic printing artifacts.

== Gallery ==
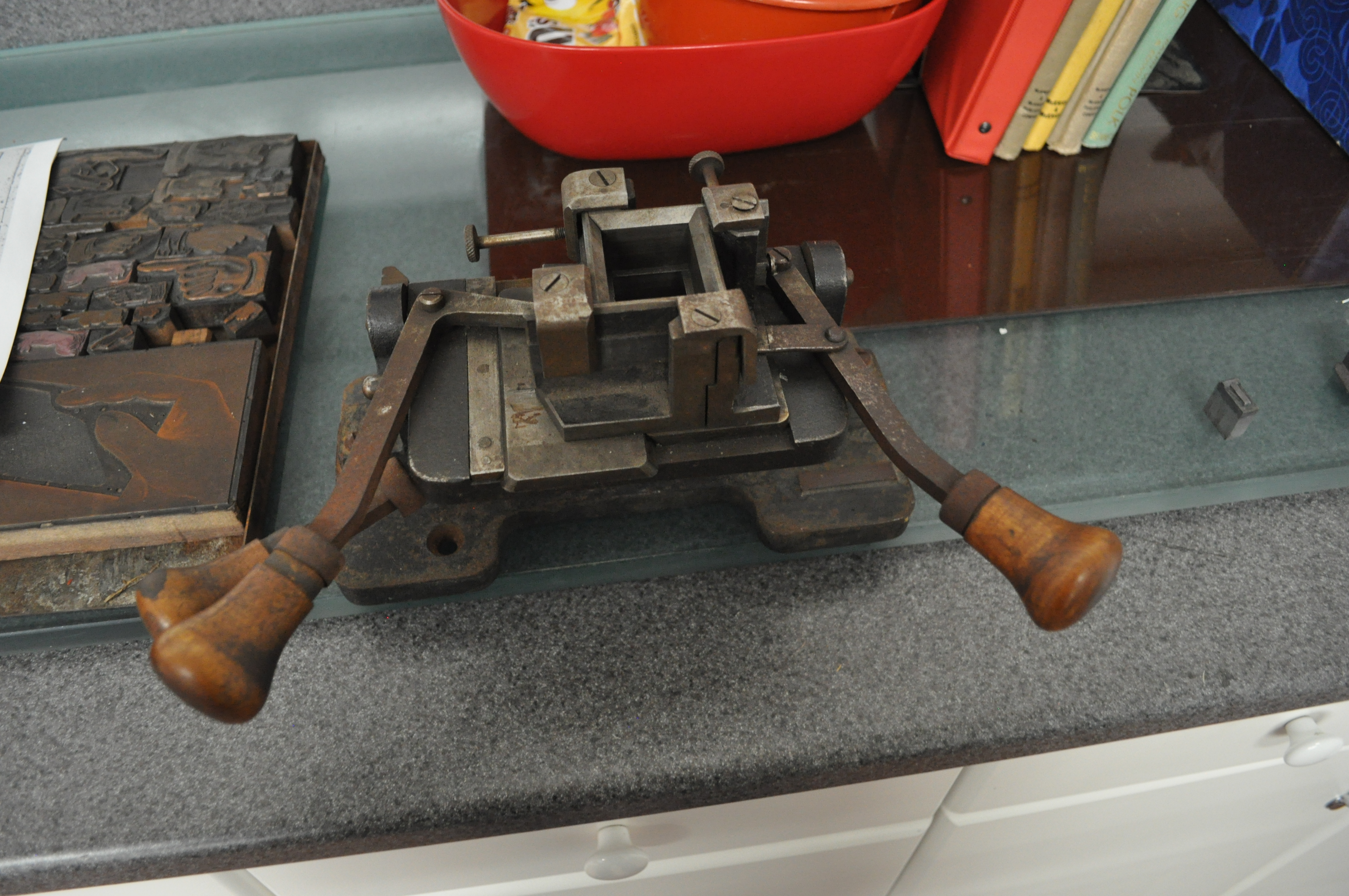
Typecasting mold

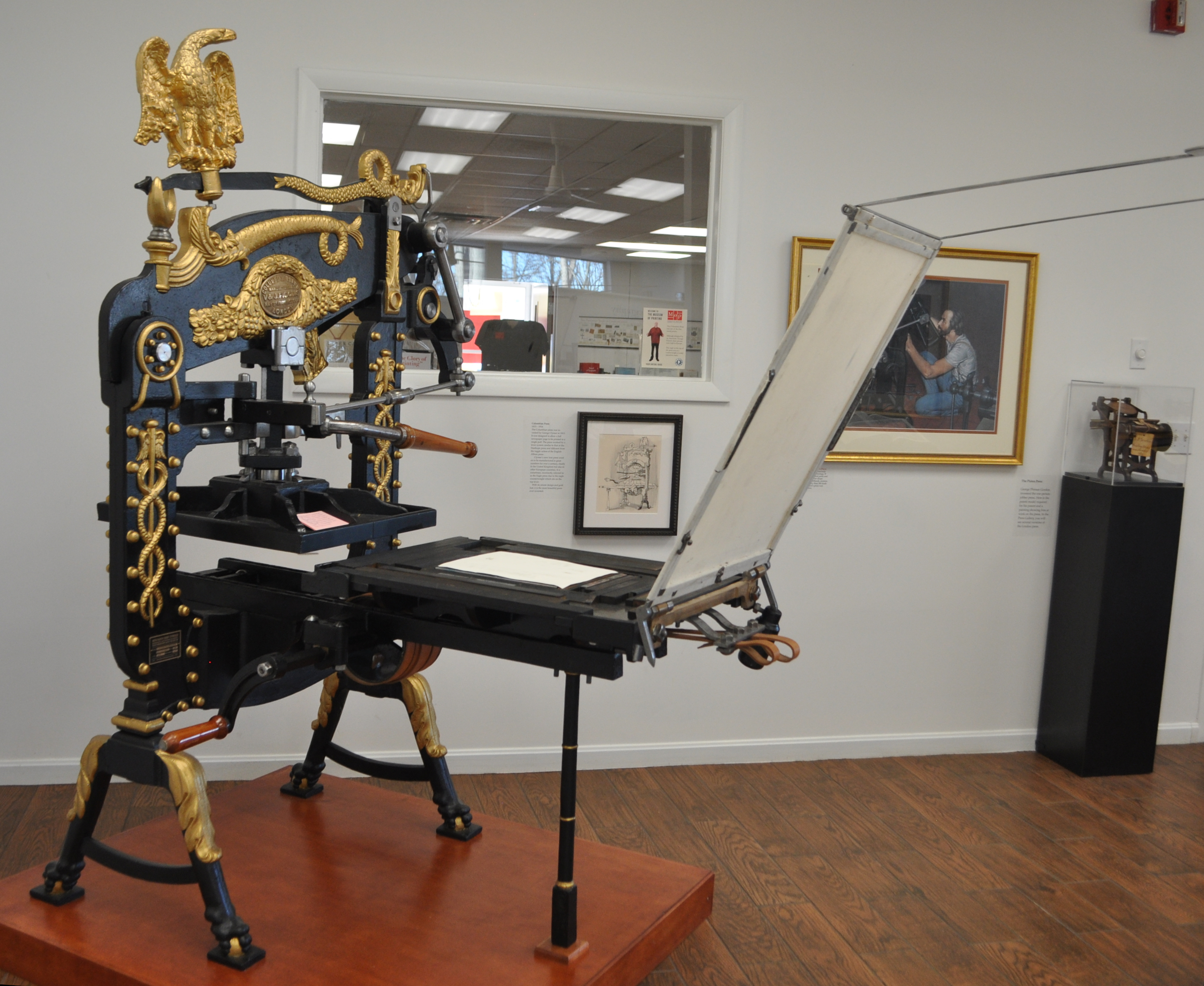
Ornately-decorated Columbian press

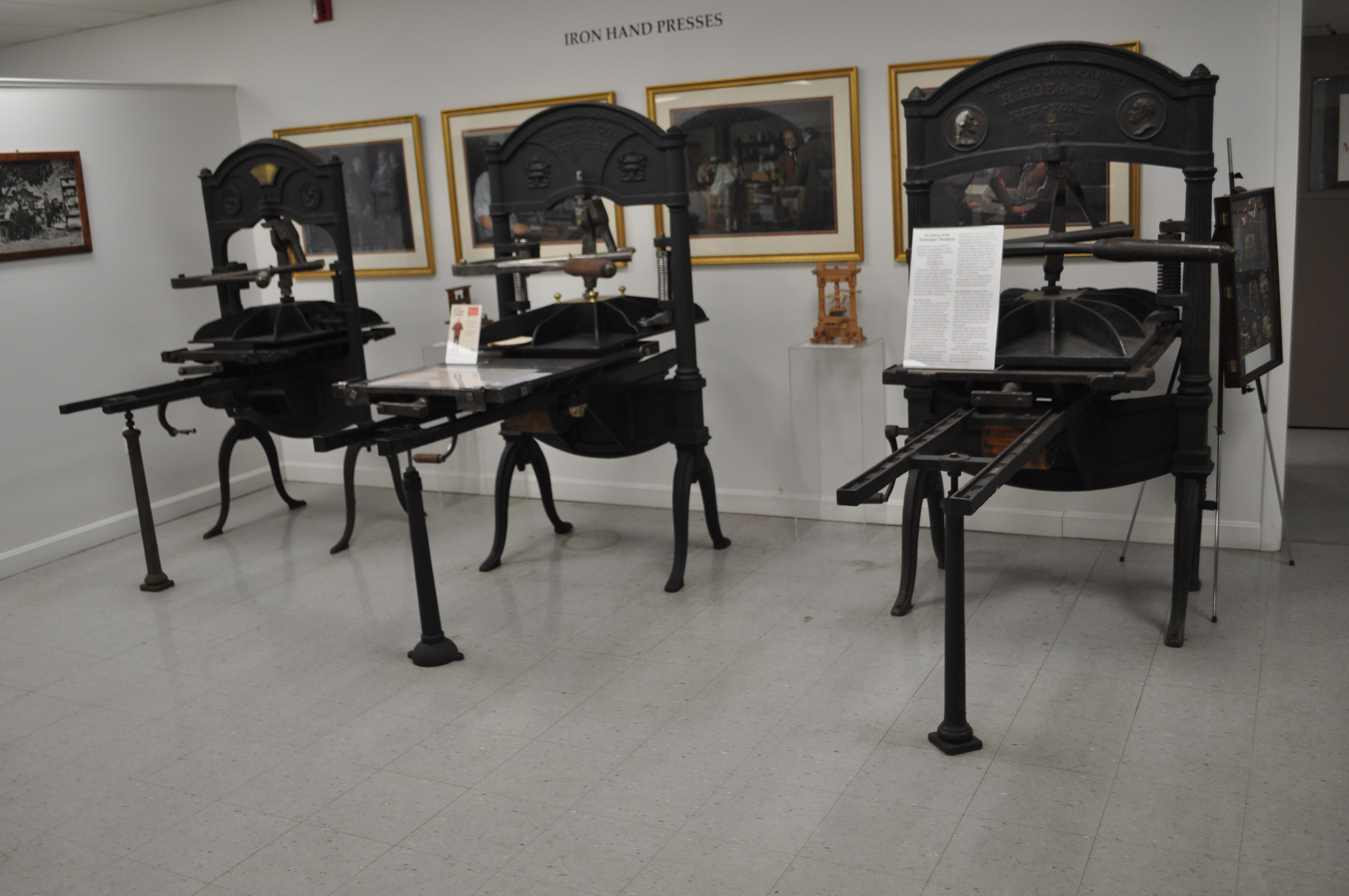
Hand-powered 19th century letterpresses

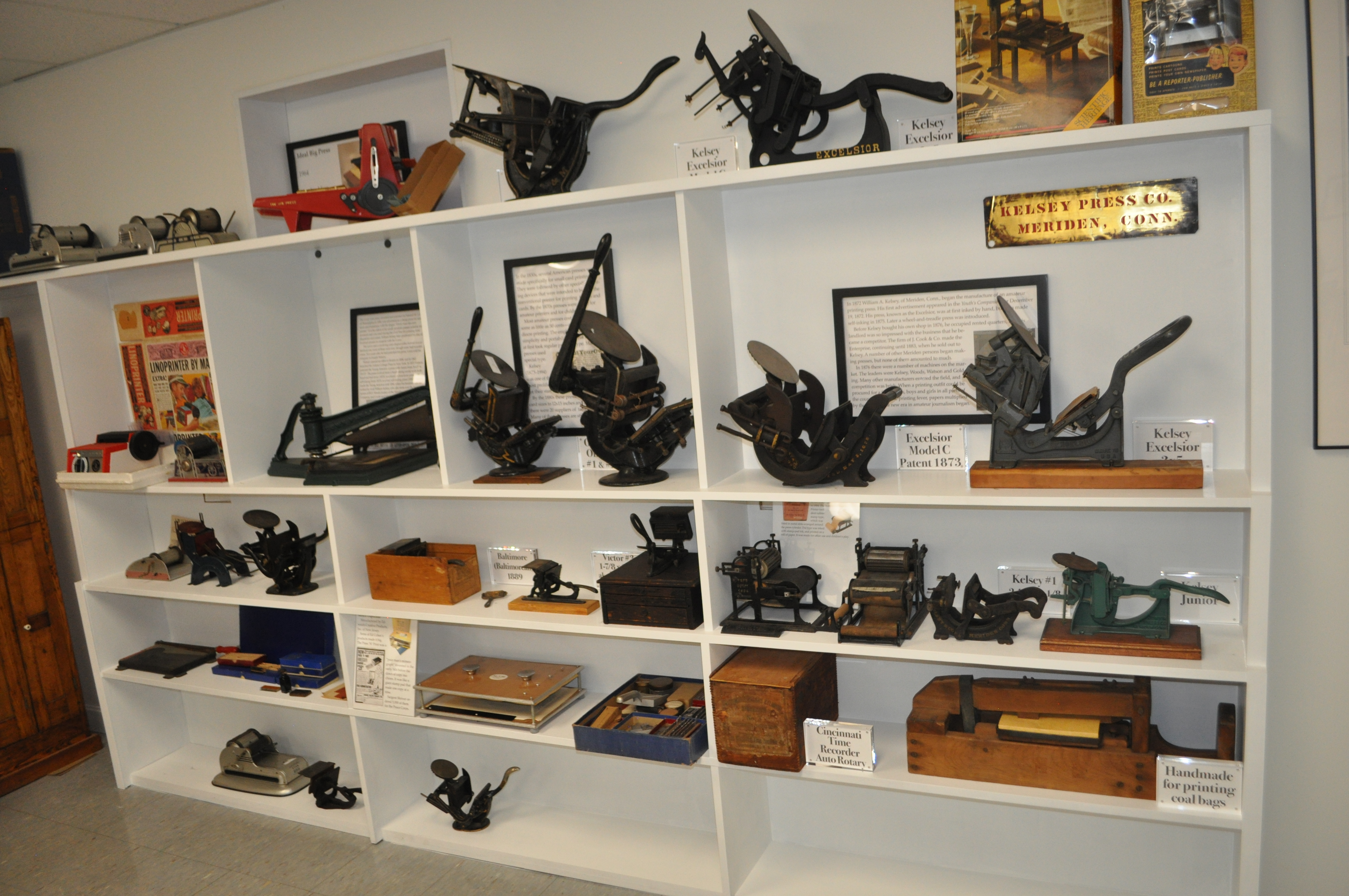
Display of small portable presses

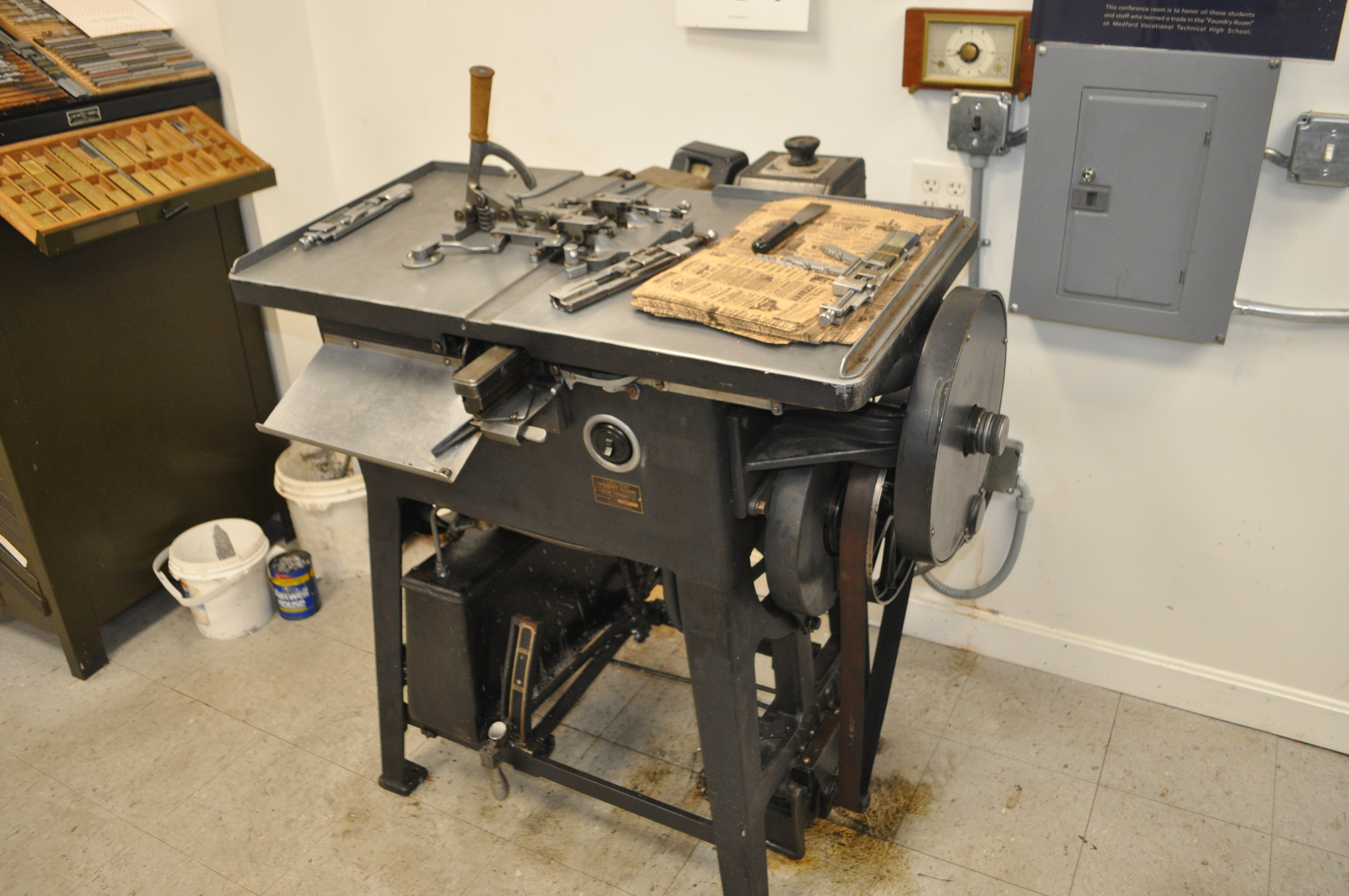
Ludlow typecaster setup

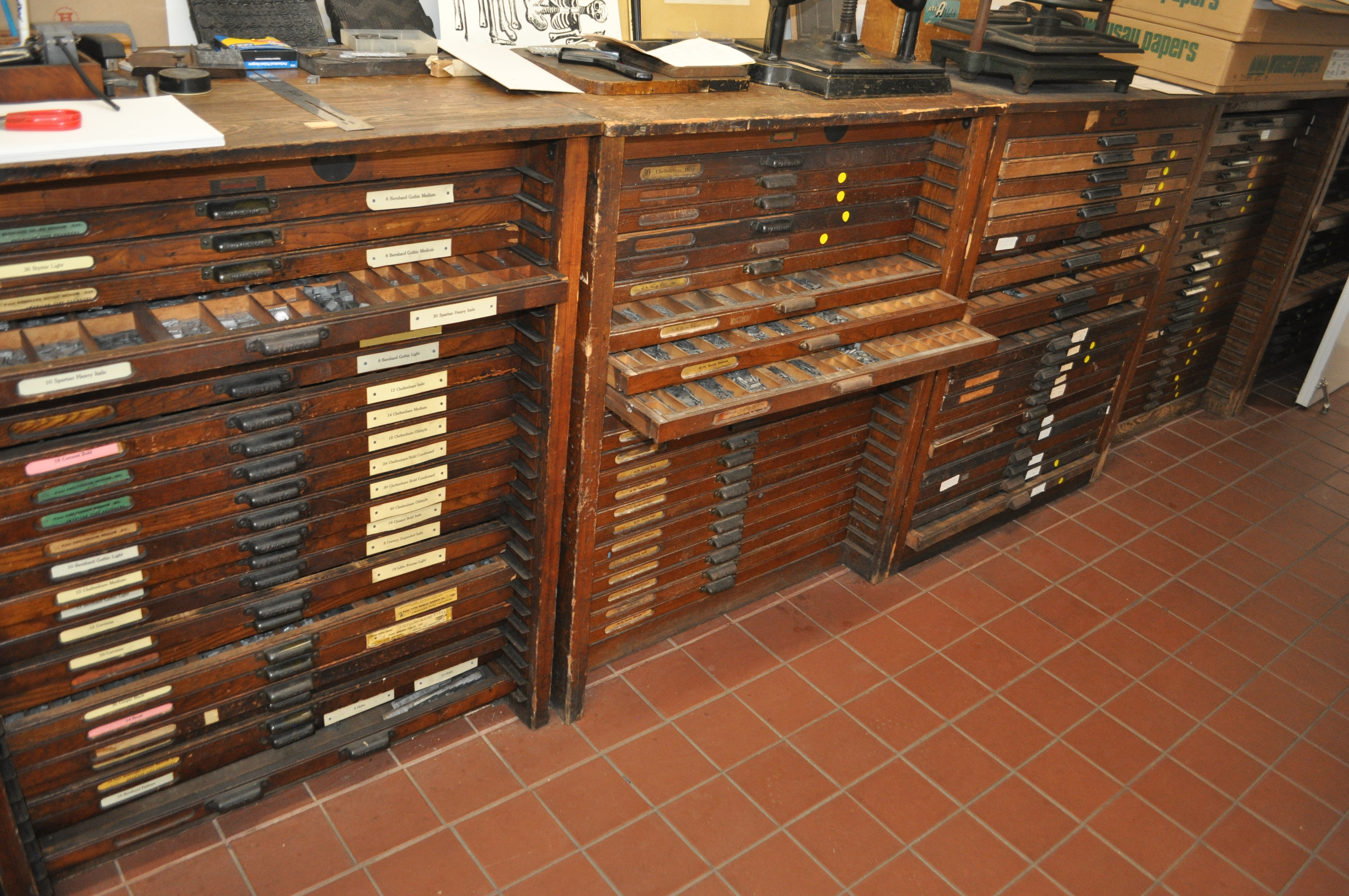
Collection of metal typefonts

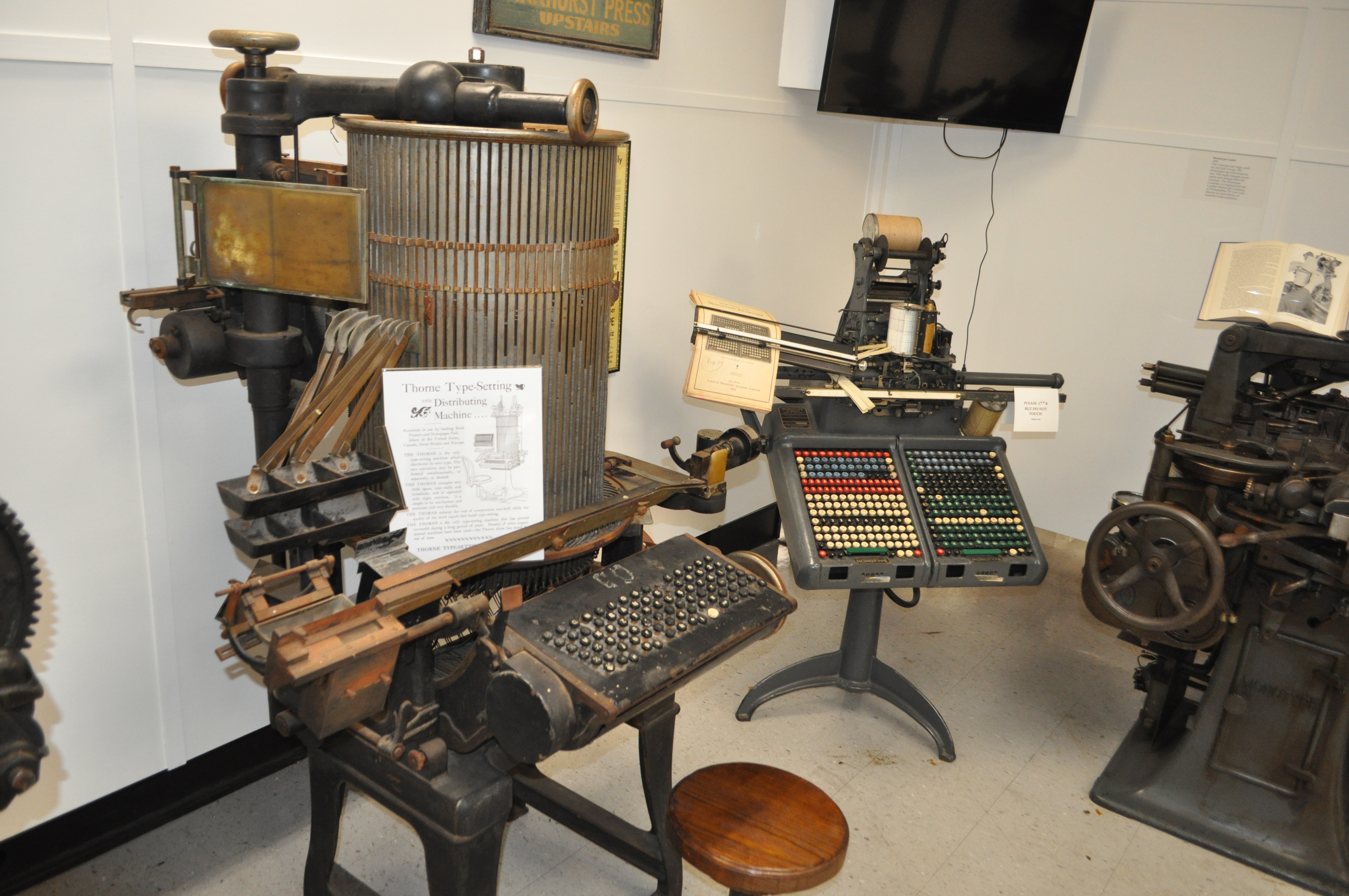
Unitype "cold metal" typesetter

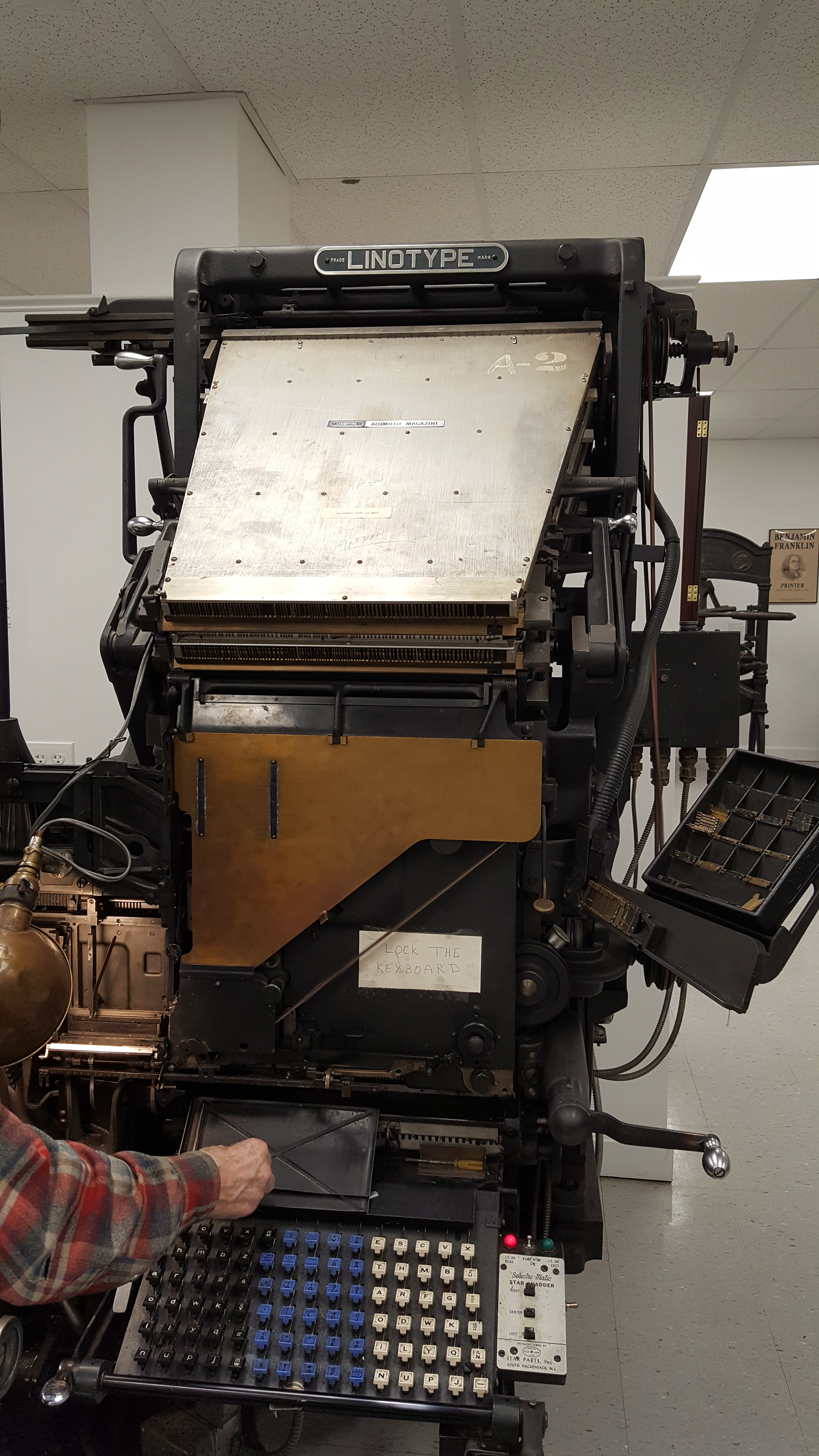
Linotype "hot metal" typesetter

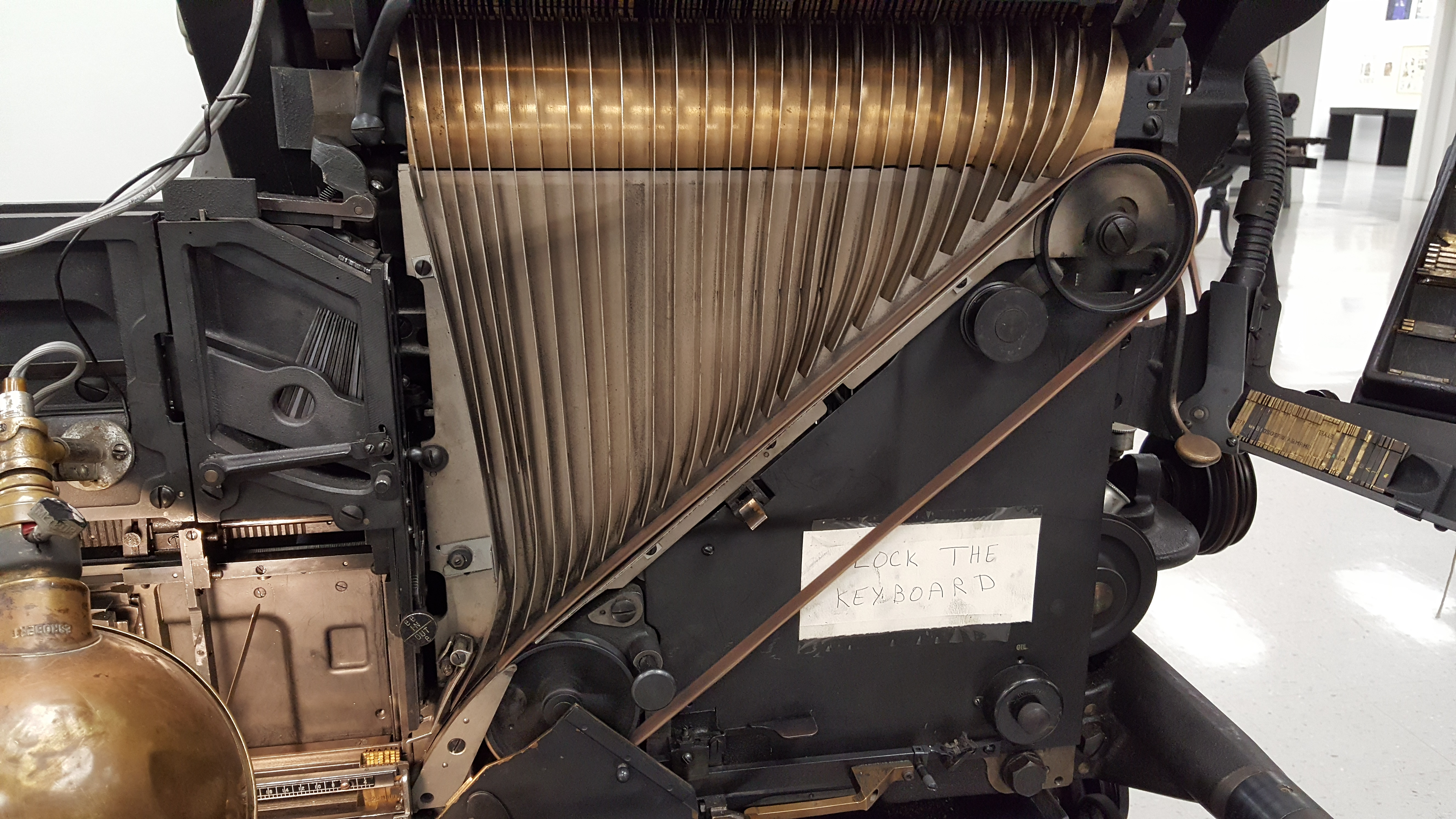
Detail of Linotype mechanism

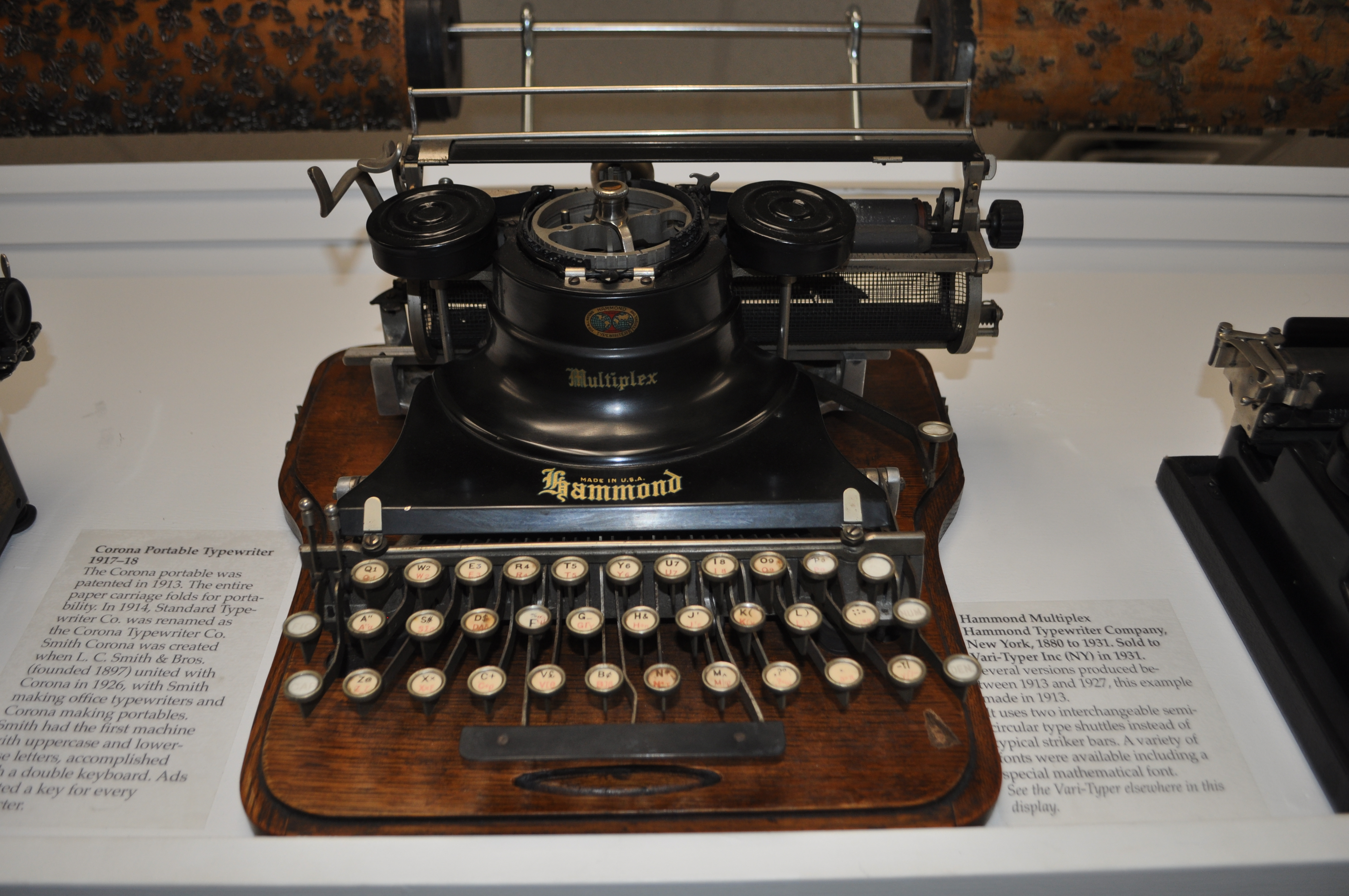
Hammond typewriter (c. 1913)

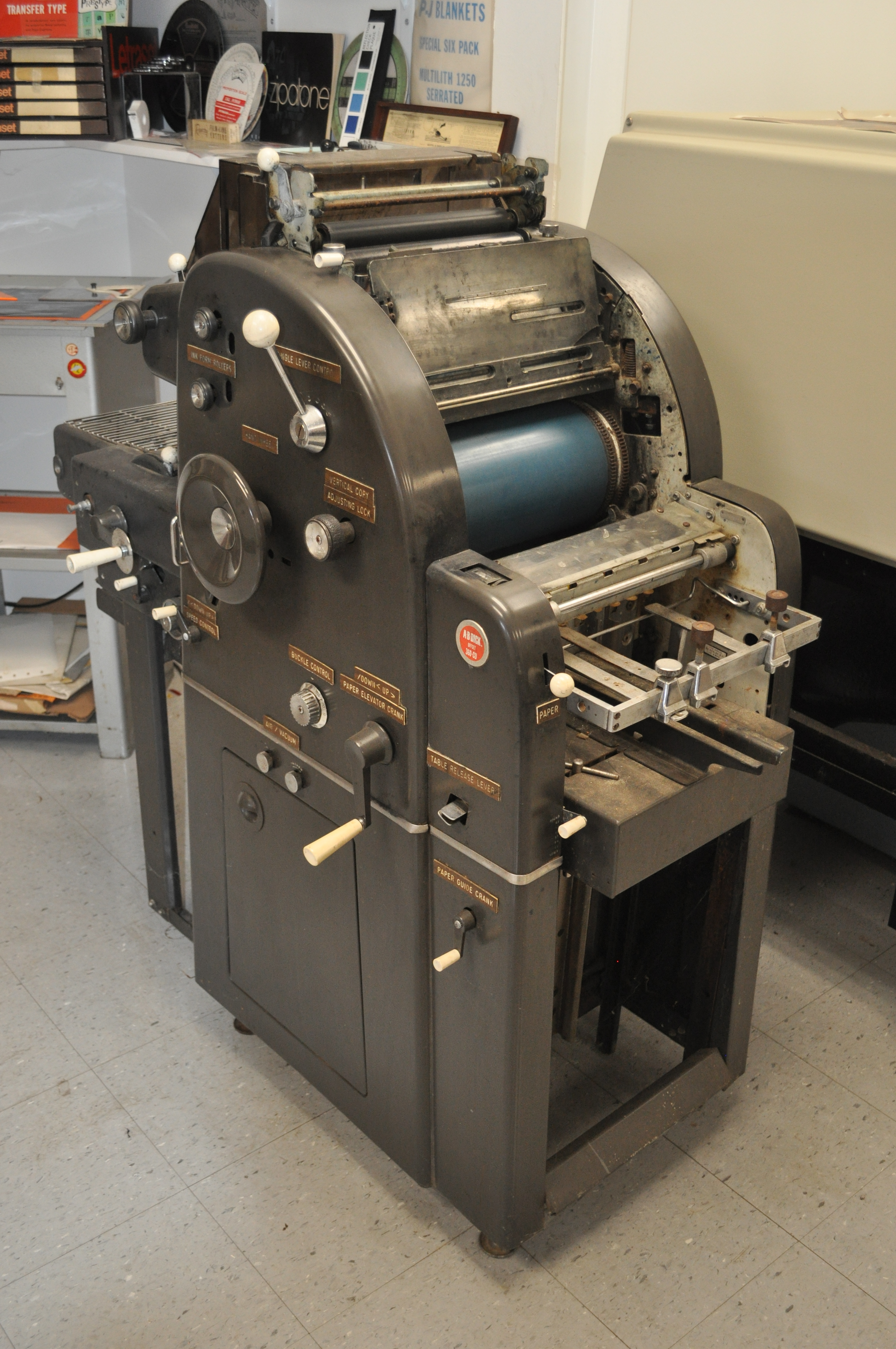
Mimeograph office duplicating machine

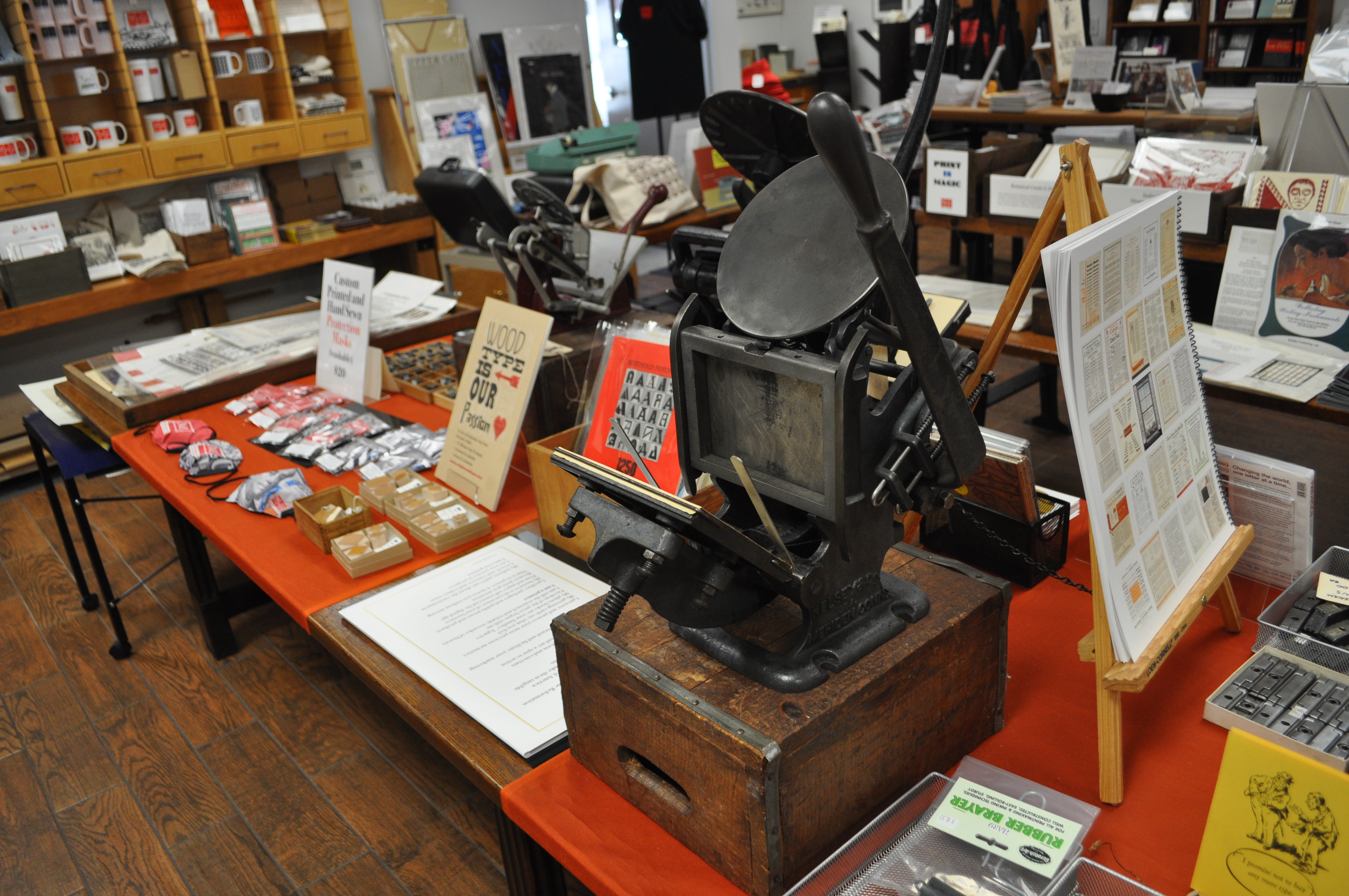
Museum store
