= Le Courrier Australien =

Australian French language newspaper

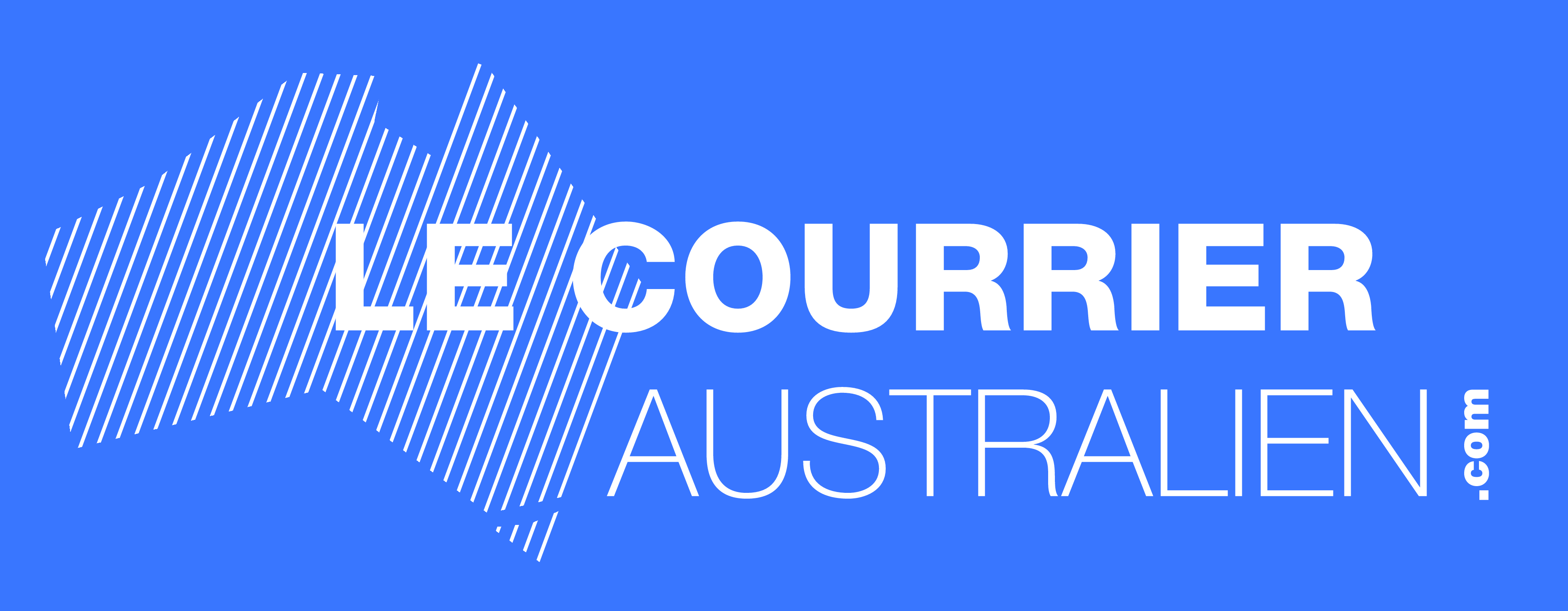
- Website type: News website
- Available in: French, English
- Creator: François Vantomme
- Website: lecourrieraustralien.com
- Launched: 2016

Front page of first edition of Le Courrier Australien, 30 April 1892

Le Courrier Australien is a bilingual French-English online newspaper based in Sydney, New South Wales, Australia.

== History ==
Published for the first time in Sydney on 30 April 1892, by Charles Wroblewski, Le Courrier Australien has been the longest running foreign language newspaper in Australia. It is a bilingual news source, providing the community with updates on the latest news in both English and French.

Le Courrier Australien has been fundamental in integrating the French speaking community in Australia while simultaneously exposing the Australian community to French language, culture, philosophy and lifestyle for over 125 years.

The publication of the printed newspaper ceased in 2011. The newspaper has been digitised and is available on Trove. In October 2016, the newspaper was revived with a digital version.

== News website ==
After five years of suspended activity, Le Courrier Australien has been re-launched by François Vantomme, founder and editor-in-chief of VoilaSydney.com, with a dynamic and digital format both in English and in French.

Based in Sydney, the website provides news, reports and interviews about Australia and France, and also covers Pacific and international news.
