= Rubric =

Text written in red ink for emphasis

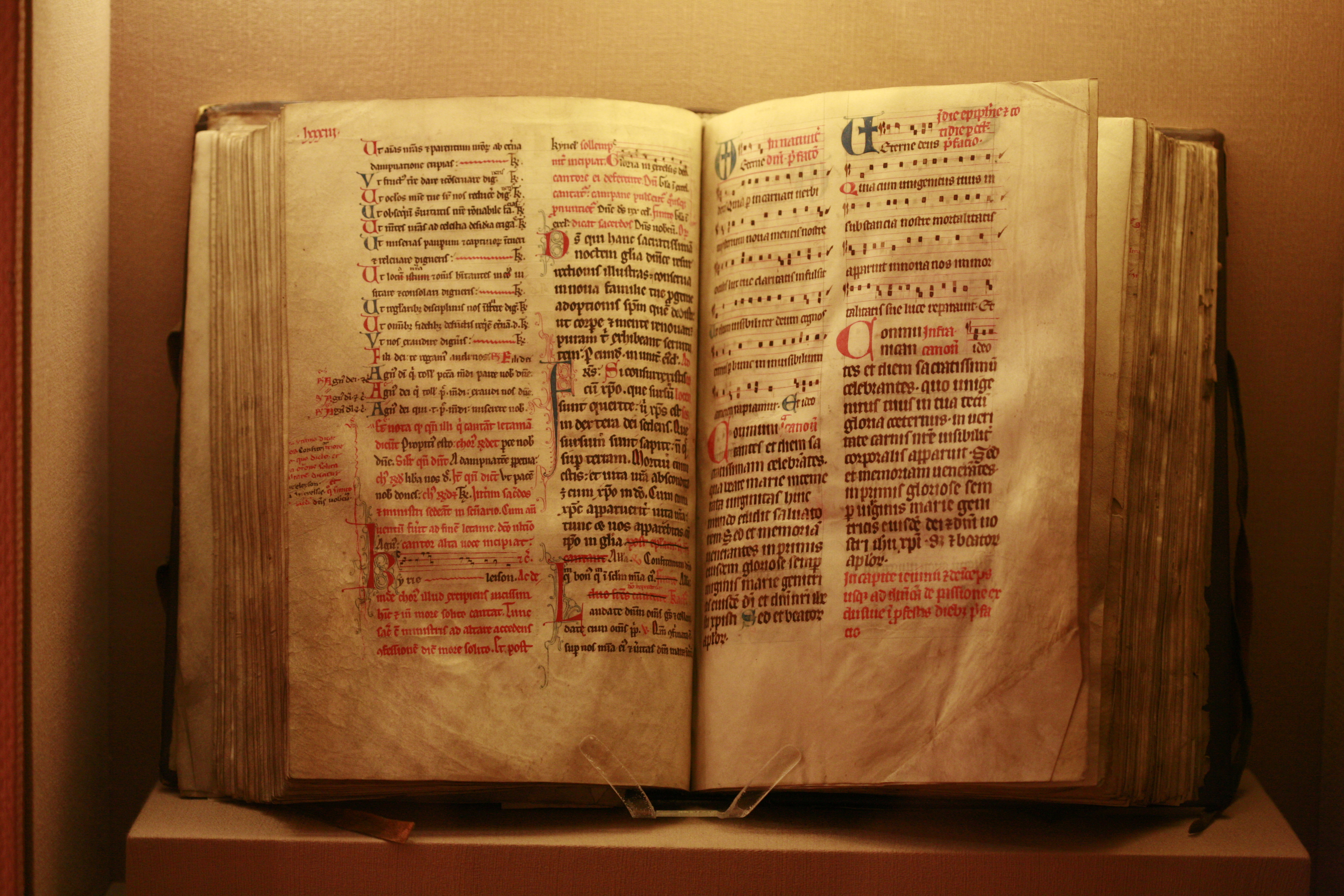
Dominican Missal, c. 1240, with rubrics in red (Historical Museum of Lausanne)

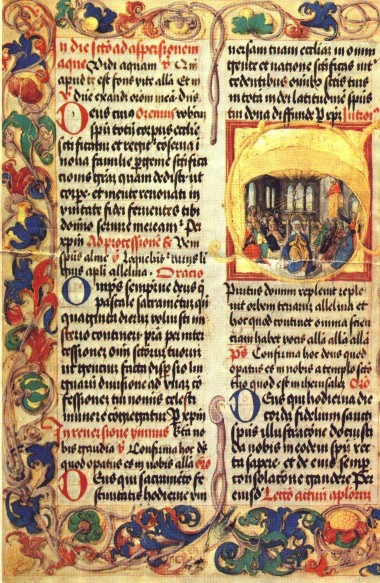
Rubrics in an illuminated gradual of c. 1500

A rubric is a word or section of text that is traditionally written or printed in red ink for emphasis. The word derives from the Latin rubrica, meaning red ochre or red chalk, and originates in medieval illuminated manuscripts from the 13th century or earlier. In these, red letters were used to highlight initial capitals (particularly of psalms), section headings and names of religious significance, a practice known as rubrication, which was a separate stage in the production of a manuscript.

Rubric can also mean the red ink or paint used to make rubrics, or the pigment used to make it. Although red was most often used, other colours came into use from the late Middle Ages onwards, and the word rubric was used for these also. Medievalists can use patterns of rubrication to help identify textual traditions.

Various figurative senses of the word have been extended from its original meaning. Usually these senses are used within the set phrase "under [whatever] rubric", for example, "under this rubric, [X is true]", or "[X was done] under the rubric of Y". Such senses include: "an authoritative rule"; "the title of a statute"; "something under which a thing is classed"; "an explanatory or introductory commentary"; "an established rule, tradition, or custom"; or "a guide listing specific criteria for grading or scoring academic assignments".

== As liturgical instructions ==
In both Jewish and Christian tradition, a lectionary was often used during services. It would have readings from sacred texts like the Bible written in black text. The person officiating would receive instruction in the rubrics and then read the text out loud to the congregation. A common version of a lectionary would include an entire year's worth of readings, perhaps encompassing a large portion of key parts of the text, e.g. the Gospels. There would frequently be readings from separate parts of the scriptures, such as a reading from a prophet followed by a reading from a Gospel that connected them. Regular days might have standard readings, while feast days would have readings relevant to the event being celebrated. Thus, a rubric might only mention the source of the reading or it might be an elaborate description of the holy day.

Instructions for a priest explaining what he must do during a liturgy were traditionally rubricated in missals and the other liturgical books, whereas the texts to be spoken aloud were in black. From this, "rubric" has a secondary denotation of an instruction in a text, regardless of how it is actually inscribed. This is the oldest recorded definition in English, found in 1375. Less formally, "rubrics" may refer to any liturgical action customarily performed, whether or not pursuant to a written instruction. The history, status, and authority of the content of rubrics are significant, and sometimes controversial, among liturgical scholars. In the past, some theologians distinguished between rubrics which they considered of Divine origin and those merely of human origin. Rubrics were probably originally verbal, and then written in separate volumes. The earliest extant liturgical books do not contain them, but from references in texts of the first millennium it appears that written versions existed. Full rubrics regarding matters such as vesture, appearance of the altar, timing of specific liturgies, and similar matters still may be published separately.

In modern liturgical practice, rubrics provide for the active participation of the congregation as well as the actions of the minister. In liturgical books such as the Catholic Roman Missal, lengthy general rubrics, probably printed in black, pertain to such matters and preface the actual order of liturgies, which contain shorter, specific rubrics that still are usually rubricated. Red is also often used to distinguish words spoken by the celebrant and those by the congregation, or by other specific persons involved in the liturgy, e.g., those marrying.

== After the development of printing ==
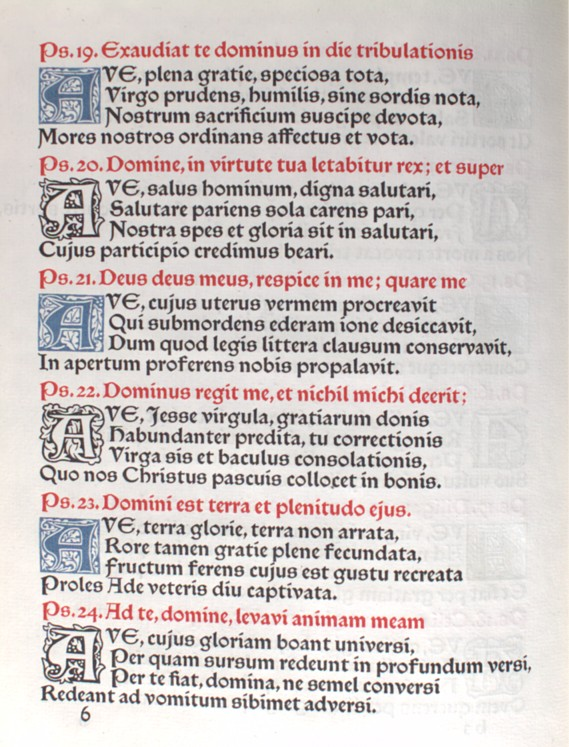
Page from the 1896 Kelmscott Press edition of the 13th century Laudes Beatae Mariae Virginis, with numbers and first lines of the Psalms rubricated in between prayers in black.

With the arrival of printing, other typographic effects such as italic type, bolded type, or different sizes of type were used to emphasize a section of text, and as printing in two colours is more expensive and time consuming, rubrication has tended to be reserved for sacred and liturgical books or luxury editions of other works.

William Morris's medievally inspired typography for the Kelmscott Press at the end of the 19th century included chapter titles and other accents in red, or rarely blue, ink, and was influential on small press art typography associated with the Arts and Crafts movement in both England and the United States, particularly the work of the Ashendene, Doves, and Roycroft Presses.

Around 1900, rubrication was incorporated into a red letter edition of the King James Version of the Bible to distinguish the Dominical words, i.e., those spoken by Jesus Christ during his corporeal life on Earth, because that translation lacked quotation marks. Other versions of the Bible have since adopted the popular practice.

== Rubrics in education ==
A rubric is an explicit set of criteria used for assessing a particular type of work or performance and provides more details than a single grade or mark. Rubrics, therefore, help teachers grade more objectively and "they improve students' ability to include required elements of an assignment".

== See also ==
- Code of Rubrics
- Rubrication
- Scriptorium
