= Harcourt =

Harcourt may refer to:

== People ==
- Harcourt (surname)
- Harcourt (given name)

== Places ==
=== Canada ===
- Harcourt Parish, New Brunswick
- Harcourt, New Brunswick, an unincorporated community
- Harcourt, Ontario, a village
- Harcourt, Newfoundland and Labrador, a former village

=== France ===
- Harcourt, Eure, a commune
  - Arboretum d'Harcourt, one of the oldest arboretums in the country

=== Hong Kong ===
- Harcourt Garden, Hong Kong, a small urban park
- Harcourt House (Hong Kong), a commercial building
- Harcourt Road, Hong Kong

=== South Georgia and the South Sandwich Islands ===
- Harcourt Island
  - Cape Harcourt

=== United Kingdom ===
- Harcourt, Cornwall, a coastal settlement
- Harcourt Hill, a hill and community in Oxfordshire
- Harcourt Arboretum, owned and run by the University of Oxford
- Kibworth Harcourt, Leicestershire
- Newton Harcourt, Leicestershire
- Stanton Harcourt, Oxfordshire
- Wigston Harcourt, a suburb of Wigston, Leicestershire

=== Elsewhere ===
- Harcourt, Victoria, Australia, a town
- Harcourt, Iowa, United States, a small city
- Harcourt Park, New Zealand, a camping ground
- Mount Vernon Harcourt, Victoria Land, Antarctica, a stratovolcano
- Harcourt Street, a street in Dublin, Ireland
- Port Harcourt, Nigeria, a city in Rivers State.

== In business ==
- Harcourt (publisher), a book publishing company or brand name
- Studio Harcourt, a prestigious photographic studio in Paris, France

== Other uses ==
- Viscount Harcourt, a title in the peerage of the United Kingdom
- House of Harcourt, a British and French noble house
- Collège d'Harcourt, in Paris, renamed the Lycée Saint-Louis in 1820
- Harcourt House, Edmonton, an art gallery in Edmonton, Alberta, Canada
- Harcourt House, London, Cavendish Square, London, a building
- USS Harcourt (1864), a Union Navy tugboat in the American Civil War
- USS Harcourt (IX-225), a Liberty ship

== See also ==
- Port Harcourt, Nigeria, a city
- Harcourts, a New Zealand real estate company
