= Harcourt (given name) =

Harcourt is a male given name. Notable people with the name include:

- Harcourt Mortimer Bengough (1837–1922), British Army general
- Harcourt Burland Bull (1824–1881), Canadian politician
- Harcourt Butler (1869–1938), Leading official in British India & Burma
- Harcourt Caughey (1911–1993), New Zealand rugby union player
- Harcourt Clare (1854–1922), English county council clerk
- Harcourt Vanden-Bempde-Johnstone, 1st Baron Derwent (1829–1916), British peer and Liberal Party politician
- Harcourt Dowsley (1919–2014), Australian sportsman
- Harcourt Godfrey (1905–1980), New Zealand wrestler
- Harcourt Gilbey Gold (1876–1952), British rower
- Harcourt Johnstone (1895–1945), British politician
- Harcourt Lees (1776–1852), Irish clergyman
- Harcourt Gladstone Malcolm (1875–1936), Bahamian lawyer and politician
- Harcourt Morgan (1867–1950), Canadian-American entomologist, educator, and agricultural expert
- Harcourt Ommundsen (1878–1915), British sports shooter
- Harcourt Powell (1718–1782), British politician
- Harcourt J. Pratt (1866–1934), American politician
- Harcourt Templeman, British screenwriter, film producer & director
- Harcourt Wason (born 1956), Barbadian sprinter
- Harcourt Whyte (1905–1977), Nigerian composer
- Harcourt Williams (1880–1957), English actor and director

As middle name

- Charles Harcourt Masters (1759–?), English surveyor and architect
- Daniel Harcourt Galbraith (1878–1968), Canadian politician
- Elizabeth Harcourt Mitchell (1833–1910), British writer
- Elliott Harcourt Montgomery (born 1961), Canadian actor
- Evelyn George Harcourt Powell (1883–1961), English politician
- Frederick Harcourt Kitchin (1867–1932), British journalist and novelist
- George Harcourt Vanden-Bampde-Johnstone, 3rd Baron Derwent (1899–1949), British author, diplomat and Liberal politician
- Joseph Harcourt Tombs (1887-1966), English Victoria Cross recipient
- Keppel Harcourt Barnard (1887–1964), South African zoologist and museum director
- William Harcourt Hooper (1834–1912), British wood-engraver
- William Harcourt Ranking (1814–1867), English physician
- Willoughby Harcourt Carter (1822–1900), First Chief Constable of Buckinghamshire

== Fictional characters ==
- Harcourt Fenton Mudd in several episodes of Star Trek

== See also ==
- Harcourt (disambiguation)
- Harcourt (surname)
