= Calf Head =

Cape in South Georgia and the South Sandwich Islands

Calf Head (54°28′S 36°3′W) is a rocky headland on the north coast of South Georgia, 3 nautical miles (6 km) northwest of Cape Harcourt. The name "Kalber-Berg" (calf mountain) was given by the German group of the International Polar Year Investigations, 1882–83, but was limited to the summit of the headland. The feature was surveyed by the South Georgia Survey, 1951–52, who reported that a name is more essential for its seaward extremity in order to distinguish it from Cape Harcourt, with which it is easily confused when viewed from the north and northwest. The English form of the name, Calf Head, was recommended by the UK Antarctic Place-Names Committee in 1954. Sacramento Bight lies on the coast between Calf Head and Cape Harcourt.
