= Charles Ricketts =

British artist, illustrator, author and printer

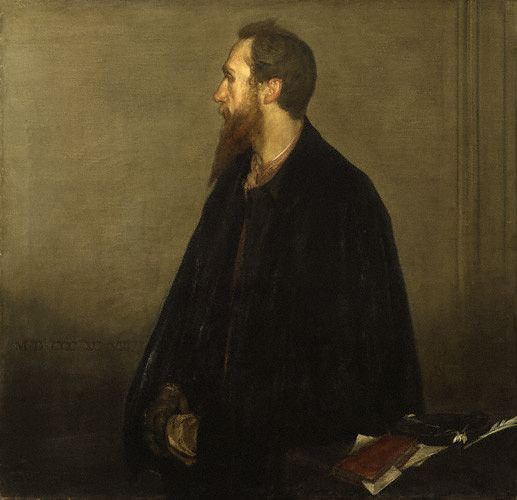
Ricketts by his partner Charles Shannon. The National Portrait Gallery says of this portrait, "It is a record of their friendship, slightly tentative in its character, with Ricketts turning his head away so that he is seen in profile. He liked it precisely for this reason since it shows him 'turning away from the 20th century to think only of the 15th.'"

Charles de Sousy Ricketts RA (2 October 1866 – 7 October 1931) was a British artist, illustrator, author and printer, known for his work as a book designer and typographer and for his costume and scenery designs for plays and operas.

Ricketts was born in Geneva to an English father and a French mother and brought up mainly in France. In 1882 he began studying wood engraving in London, where he met a fellow student, Charles Shannon, who became his lifelong companion and artistic collaborator. Ricketts first made his mark in book production, first as an illustrator, and then as the founder and driving force of the Vale Press (1896–1904), one of the leading private presses of the day, for which he designed the type and illustrations. A disastrous fire at the printers led to the closure of the press, and Ricketts turned increasingly to painting and sculpture over the following two decades.

In 1906 he also began a career as a theatre designer, first for works by his friend Oscar Wilde and later for plays by writers including Aeschylus, Hugo von Hofmannsthal, William Shakespeare, Bernard Shaw, and W. B. Yeats. His most enduring theatre designs, which remained in use for more than 50 years, were for Gilbert and Sullivan's The Mikado. With Shannon, Ricketts built up a substantial collection of paintings, drawings and sculpture. He established a reputation as an art connoisseur, and in 1915 turned down the offer of the directorship of the National Gallery. He later regretted that decision, but served as adviser to the National Gallery of Canada from 1924 until his death. He wrote three books of art criticism, two volumes of short stories and a memoir of Wilde. Selections from his letters and diaries were posthumously published.

== Life and career ==
=== Early years ===
Ricketts was born in Geneva, the only son of Charles Robert Ricketts (1838–1883) and Hélène Cornélie de Soucy (1833 or 1834–1880), daughter of Louis, Marquis de Soucy. He had a sister, Blanche (1868–1903). His father had served as a First Lieutenant in the Royal Navy before being invalided out at age 25 due to wounds. It was an artistic household: his father was an amateur painter of marine subjects, and his mother was musical. Ricketts spent his early childhood in Lausanne and London, and his early teens in Boulogne and Amiens. Except for a year at a boarding-school near Tours he was educated by governesses.

Hélène Ricketts died in 1880 and her widower moved to London with his two children. Ricketts was at that stage hardly able to speak English. His biographer Paul Delaney writes that the boy was considered "too delicate to attend school", and consequently was largely self-educated, "reading voraciously and 'basking' in museums; he thus escaped being moulded along conventional lines".

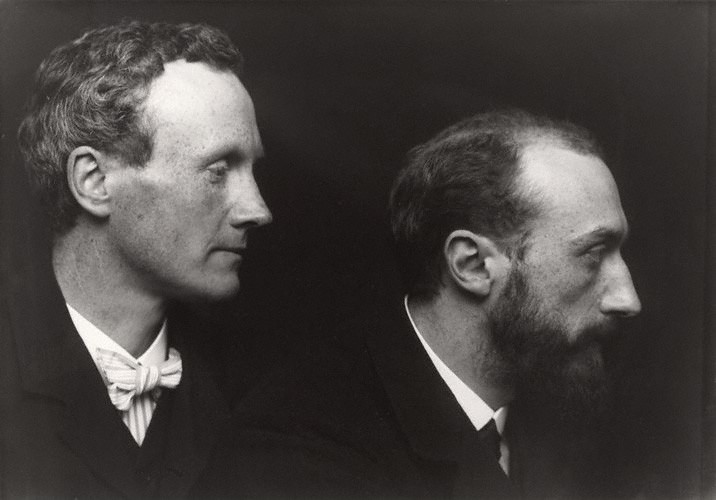
Charles Haslewood Shannon and Ricketts by George Charles Beresford

In 1882 Ricketts entered the City and Guilds Technical Art School in Kennington, London, where he was apprenticed to Charles Roberts, a prominent wood-engraver. The following year Ricketts's father died, and Ricketts became dependent on his paternal grandfather, who supported him with a modest allowance. On his sixteenth birthday he met the painter and lithographer Charles Haslewood Shannon, with whom he formed a lifelong personal and professional partnership. The Times described their relationship:

... a lifelong friendship of so close a nature that from that time onwards the two shared the same studio and lived together in a state of celibate commensalism as remarkable as any of the great historic friendships, or the finest Darby and Joan examples of wedded felicity. It was seldom "I think" or "I do" in the Ricketts and Shannon ménage, but almost invariably "We think" and "We do."

=== The Vale Press ===
After concluding their studies at Kennington, the two men considered going to live and work in Paris, as several of their contemporaries had done. They consulted Pierre Puvis de Chavannes, an artist they revered, (Note: In a 2003 study of Ricketts, Emmanuel Cooper writes that the artist "identified with the ideals of the Aesthetic Movement", and was inspired by Renaissance art and such French artists as Puvis de Chavannes and Gustave Moreau.) who advised them against it, considering the current trends of French art to be excessively naturalistic – "photographic drawing". Shannon, three years the senior, took a teaching post at the Croydon School of Art, and Ricketts earned money from commercial and magazine illustrations.

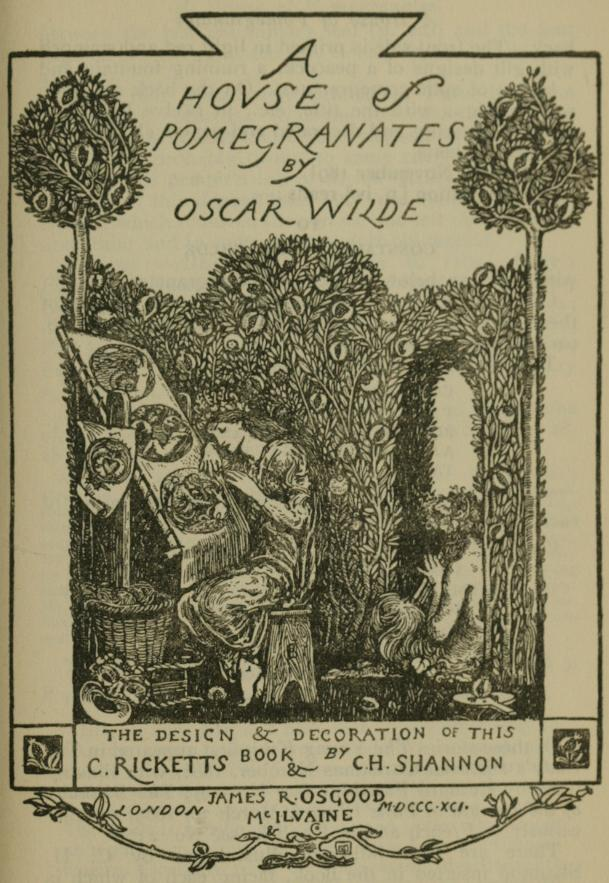
Frontispiece for A House of Pomegranates, 1891

In 1888 Ricketts took over James Abbott Whistler's former house, No 1, The Vale, in Chelsea, which became the focus of contemporary artists. (Note: Ricketts and Shannon's circle included Laurence Binyon, John Gray, Katherine Bradley and Edith Cooper (known jointly as Michael Field), Lucien Pissarro, William Rothenstein and Thomas Sturge Moore, as well as Oscar Wilde, who commented that Ricketts and Shannon's house was "the one house in London where you will never be bored.") They produced The Dial, a magazine devoted to art, that had five issues from 1889 to 1897. Among their circle was Oscar Wilde, for whom Ricketts illustrated his books A House of Pomegranates (1891) and The Sphinx (1894), and painted, in the style of François Clouet, the hero of Wilde's short story, "The Portrait of Mr. W. H." used as the frontispiece of the book. Ricketts and Shannon worked together on editions of "Daphnis and Chloe" (1893) and "Hero and Leander" (1894). Reviewing the former, The Times singled out the "beautiful type [and] the very charming woodcuts and initial letters with which it is enriched by two accomplished artists, Mr. Charles Ricketts and Mr. Charles Shannon, who are jointly responsible for the designs, while the actual woodcut execution is the work of Mr. Ricketts."

Inspired by the work of A. H. Mackmurdo and William Morris's Kelmscott Press, Ricketts and Shannon set up a small press over which, according to the critic Emmanuel Cooper, Ricketts exercised complete control of design and production. He told Lucien Pissarro that he intended "to do for the book something in the line of what William Morris did for furniture". Cooper writes that Ricketts designed founts, initials, borders and illustrations for the press, "blending medieval, Renaissance and contemporary imagery". His woodcut illustrations "often incorporated the swirling lines of Art Nouveau and androgynous figures". The Vale Press, which existed between 1896 and 1904, published more than eighty volumes, mostly reprints of English poetic classics, and earned a reputation as "one of the big six amongst modern presses". (Note: The others were the Kelmscott, Doves, Ashendene, Eragny, and Essex House Presses.) Initially, Ricketts financed the Vale publications by inviting subscriptions, but in 1894 its finances were put on a more secure footing when he was introduced to a rich barrister, William Llewellyn Hacon, who invested £1,000 and became Ricketts's business partner in the firm. A fire at the printers in 1904 destroyed the press's woodcuts, and Ricketts and Shannon decided to abandon publishing and turn to other work. They closed the Vale Press and threw the type into the river. Ricketts marked the demise of the press by publishing a complete bibliography of its publications. Thereafter, he occasionally designed books for friends such as Michael Field (the joint pen name of Katherine Harris and Emma Cooper) and Gordon Bottomley.

=== Paintings and sculpture ===
Ricketts increasingly turned to painting and sculpture. A later painter, Thomas Lowinsky, has commented on how different Ricketts's styles were as a book designer on the one hand and as a painter on the other: "his books expressed in their pre-Raphaelitism the English side of his character, whilst his pictures, with their debt to Delacroix and Gustave Moreau, the French". Delaney cites Symbolist influences, seen in his choice of themes:

tragic and romantic... focused on key moments in the destiny of his subjects, such as Salome, Cleopatra, Don Juan, Montezuma, and (though Ricketts was a non-believer) Christ, figures he admired for the way they courageously met their fates.

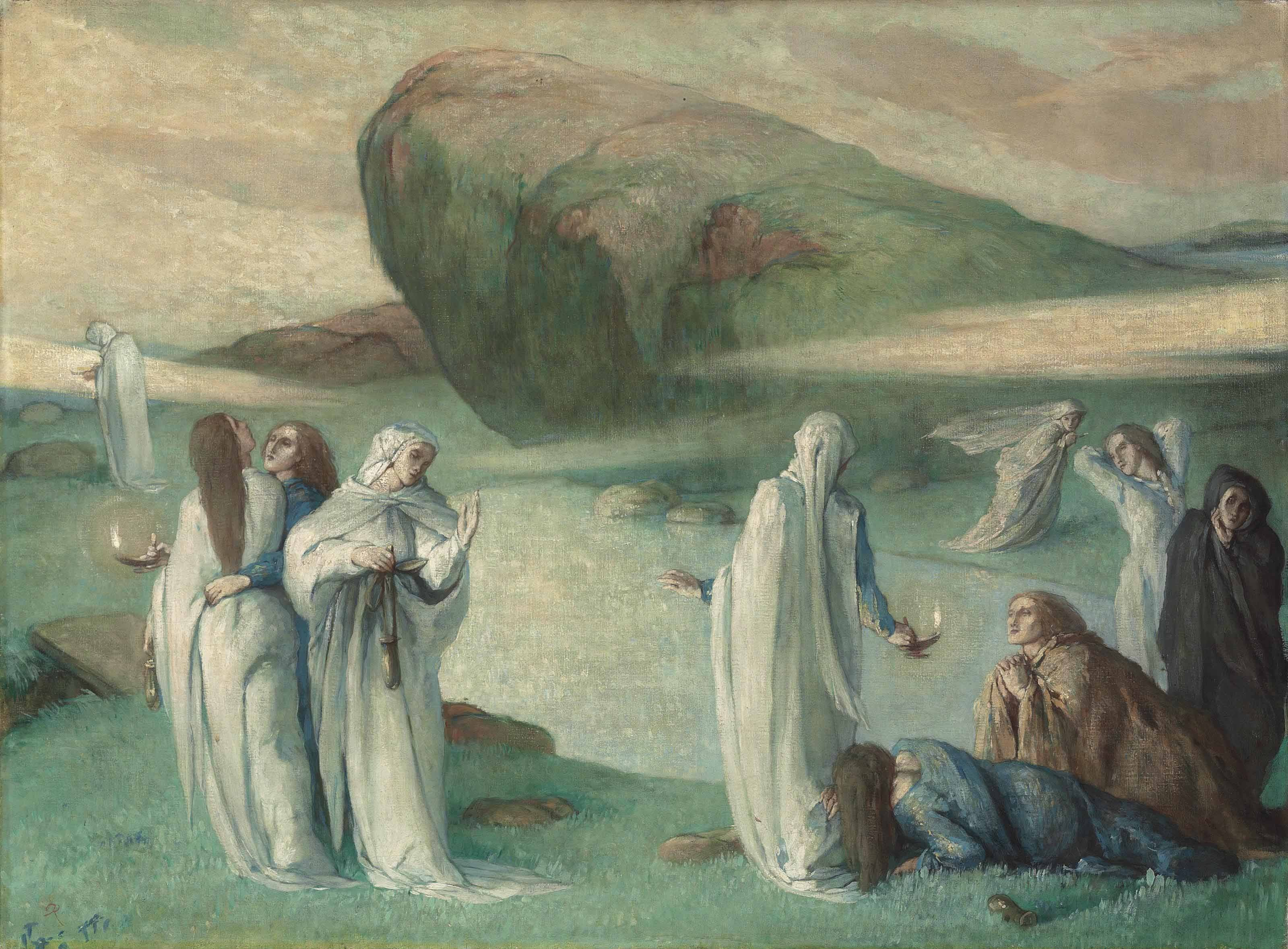
The Wise and Foolish Virgins (c. 1913)

Delaney ranks among Ricketts's best paintings The Betrayal of Christ (1904); (Note: In the Tullie House Museum and Art Gallery, Carlisle.) Don Juan and the Statue (1905) and The Death of Don Juan (1911); (Note: In the Tate Gallery collection.) Bacchus in India (c.1913); (Note: In the Atkinson Art Gallery and Library, Southport).) The Wise and Foolish Virgins (c. 1913); (Note: In a private collection.) The Death of Montezuma (c. 1915); (Note: In a private collection.) and The Return of Judith (1919), and Jepthah's Daughter (1924). (Note: Both in the Ashmolean Museum, Oxford)) At least one of Ricketts's paintings – The Plague – is in a continental gallery, the Musée d'Orsay, Paris. In Delaney's view, Ricketts's considerable scholarship was a mixed blessing as his deep knowledge of earlier painters sometimes inhibited his work, both as a painter and as a sculptor. The influence of Rodin is seen in Ricketts's sculptures, which number about twenty and include Silence, a memorial to Wilde. Delaney finds more power in Ricketts's bronzes, citing Orpheus and Eurydice (Tate collection) and Paolo and Francesca (Fitzwilliam Museum, Cambridge) as striking interpretations of their subjects. A contemporary critic remarked that despite their "unusually beautiful colour" and "curious but definite, half-literary, half-pictorial appeal", Rickett's paintings were "probably the least important and satisfactory part of the output of a man who was undoubtedly one of the most gifted, versatile, and outstanding in the world of art of his day".

In 1915 Ricketts was offered the directorship of the National Gallery, but having controversial views on how the gallery's paintings ought to be shown he turned down the post, which he later regretted. Although never formally employed by the gallery he was nevertheless consulted about some of the hangings of the rooms. He had been approached about letting his name go forward for nomination to the Royal Academy in 1905, but declined out of concern that Shannon might feel slighted. Shannon was elected as a member in 1920, and Ricketts followed, as an associate member in 1922, and a full member in 1928. In 1929 he was appointed a member of the Royal Fine Arts Commission. He was also a member of the International Society of Sculptors, Painters and Gravers, and served as art adviser to the National Gallery of Canada in Ottawa from 1924 to 1931.

=== Theatre design ===
Ricketts became a celebrated designer for the stage. "Mr Ricketts is infallible in his ideas on costume" observed The Times. His career as a theatre designer lasted from 1906 to 1931. He began by working on a double bill of Wilde plays – Salome and A Florentine Tragedy – at the King's Hall, Covent Garden, given as a private production because Wilde's biblical drama was refused a licence for public performance. (Note: The play starred "Miss Darragh" (Letitia Marion Dallas) as Salome, Robert Farquharson as Herod, and Lewis Casson as Jokanaan.) For the same company Ricketts designed Aeschylus's The Persians in 1907, for which his costumes and scenery received considerably better notices than the play. For the commercial theatre during the 1900s Ricketts designed Laurence Binyon's Attila (with Oscar Asche at His Majesty's Theatre), Electra by Hofmannsthal (with Mrs Patrick Campbell at the New Theatre, 1908), and King Lear (with Norman McKinnel, at the Haymarket, 1909). During the 1910s he designed Bernard Shaw's The Dark Lady of the Sonnets (1910), Arnold Bennett's Judith (1916), and Shaw's Annajanska, the Bolshevik Empress (1918).

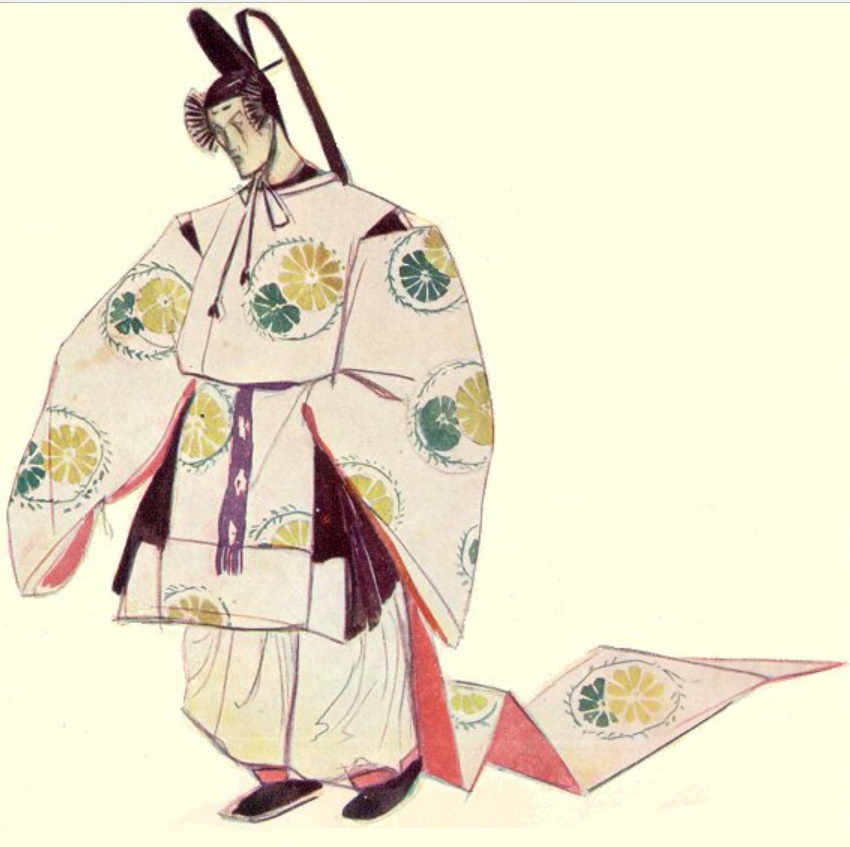
Design for the title character in Gilbert and Sullivan's The Mikado

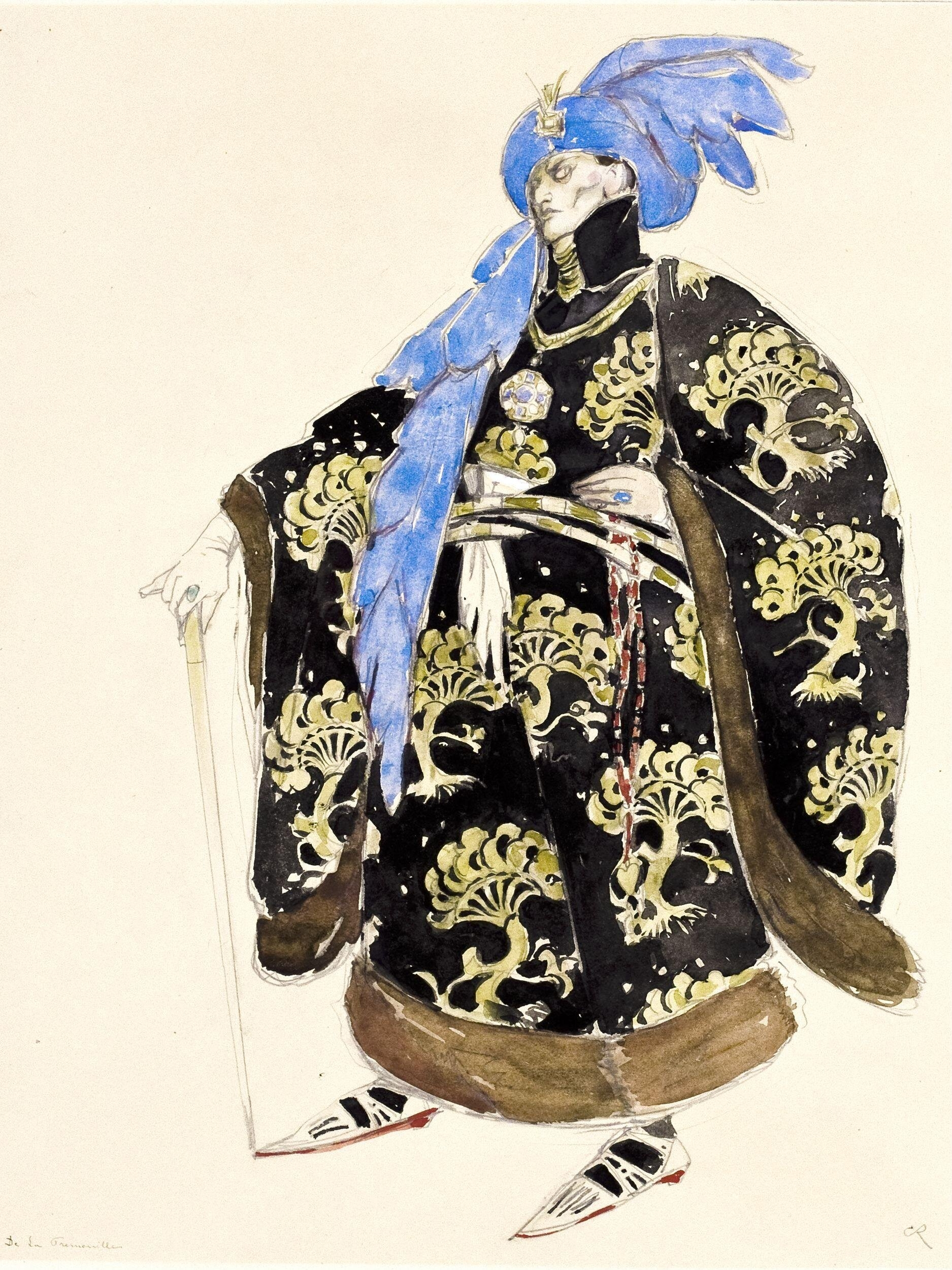
Design for Tremouille in Shaw's Saint Joan

After the First World War Ricketts resumed his theatrical activity, and designed The Betrothal, by Maurice Maeterlinck (with Gladys Cooper) at the Gaiety Theatre (1921), Shaw's Saint Joan (with Sybil Thorndike) at the New Theatre (1924), Henry VIII (with Lewis Casson and Thorndike) at the Empire Theatre (1925) and Macbeth (with Henry Ainley, Thorndyke and Casson) at the Princes Theatre (1926). In the same year he designed costumes and scenery for the D'Oyly Carte Opera Company's production of The Mikado at the Savoy Theatre, and did the same in 1929 for their The Gondoliers at the same theatre. Most of Ricketts's costume designs for The Mikado were retained by subsequent designers of the D'Oyly Carte productions for more than 50 years. (Note: Ricketts's scenic designs for The Gondoliers were retained until 1957 and the costume designs for a further year, after which they were replaced by designs by Peter Goffin. The costume designs for The Mikado can be seen at the Gilbert and Sullivan Archive.)

Outside London, Ricketts worked for the Abbey Theatre, Dublin, in 1912 on plays by W. B. Yeats and J. M. Synge, and designed John Masefield's The Coming of Christ, staged in Canterbury Cathedral in 1928. His final theatre designs were for Ferdinand Bruckner's Elizabeth of England (with Phyllis Neilson-Terry at the Cambridge Theatre, London (1931) and Donald Tovey's opera The Bride of Dionysus, which was staged in Edinburgh after Ricketts's death.

After Ricketts's death the National Art Collections Fund bought a collection of his drawings for theatrical costumes and scenery, and arranged for them to be exhibited at galleries in London and throughout Britain. Twelve of the drawings were shown in the Winter Exhibition of the Royal Academy, and a selection of eighty from the remainder of the drawings was shown at the Victoria and Albert Museum.

=== Collector and writer ===
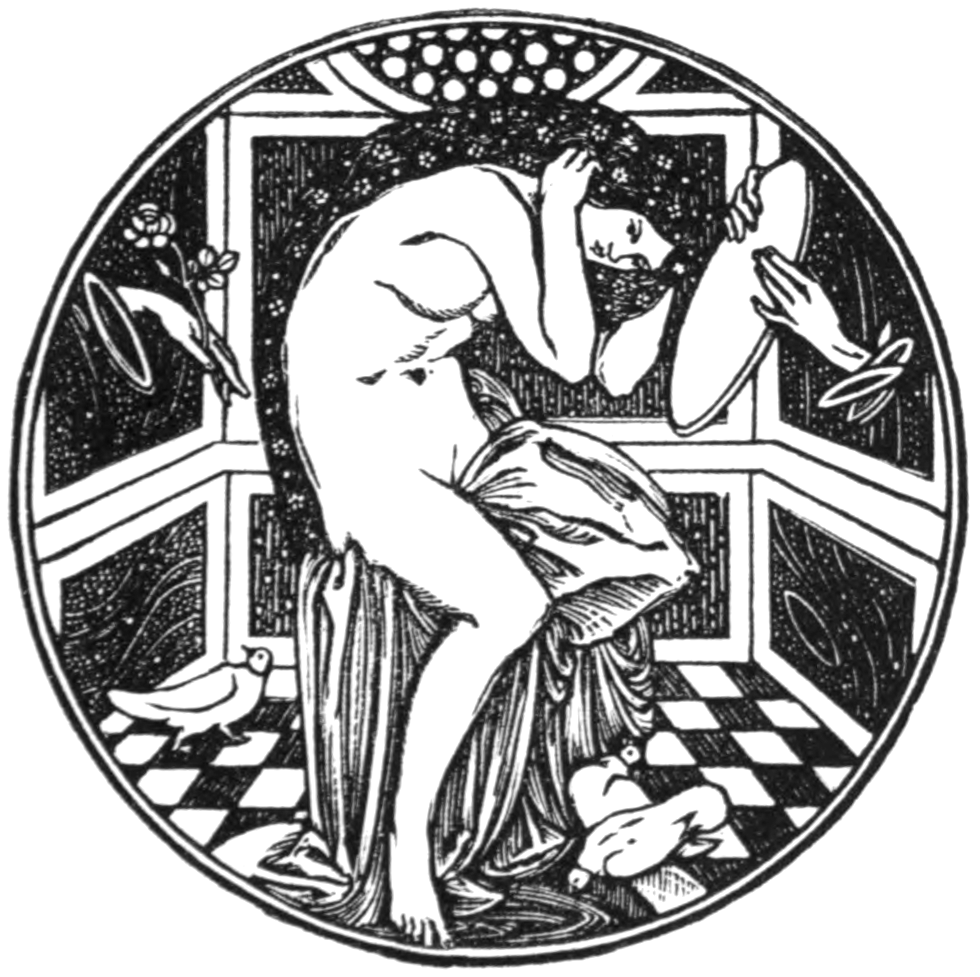
"Psyche's Looking Glass", woodcut, 1903

Together with Shannon, Ricketts accumulated a collection of drawings and paintings (French, English, and old masters), Greek and Egyptian antiquities, Persian miniatures, and Japanese prints and drawings. The collection was bequeathed to public art galleries, principally the Fitzwilliam Museum in Cambridge.

Ricketts achieved some success as a writer. He published two monographs: The Prado and its Masterpieces (1903), and Titian (1910). Delaney comments that although superseded by modern scholarship, they remain "among the most evocative books on art in English". Pages on Art, a selection of Ricketts's essays and articles for publications including The Burlington Magazine and The Morning Post, was published in 1913. It covered an eclectic range of subjects including Charles Conder, Shannon, post-impressionism, Puvis de Chavannes, G. F. Watts, Chinese and Japanese art, and stage design. (Note: The article on Shannon, written for a journal in France, is in French.)

Under the pen-name Jean Paul Raymond, Ricketts wrote and designed two collections of short stories, Beyond the Threshold (1928) and Unrecorded Histories (1933). Under the same pseudonym he wrote Recollections of Oscar Wilde (1932), a highly personal memoir, published after his death; it was described by The Observer as "a loyal and sensitive commemoration" of the man Ricketts regarded as the most remarkable he had met. After Ricketts's death Cecil Lewis edited selections from the artist's letters and diaries, which were published as Self-Portrait in 1939.

=== Last years and legacy ===
Ricketts's last years were overshadowed by the illness of Shannon. They had remained together since they first met, despite several affairs Shannon had with women. While hanging a picture at their house in Regent's Park in January 1929, Shannon fell and suffered permanent brain damage. To pay for Shannon's care Ricketts sold some of their collection. Delaney writes that the strain of the situation, compounded by overwork, contributed to Ricketts's death.

On 7 October 1931 Ricketts died suddenly, aged 65, from angina pectoris at the Regent's Park house. A memorial service was held at St James's, Piccadilly, on 12 October, attended by many from the art world including Robert Anning Bell, Alfred Drury, Gerald Kelly, Sir John Lavery, Henry Macbeth-Raeburn and Julius Olsson. He was cremated at Golders Green Crematorium; his ashes were partly scattered in Richmond Park, London, and the remainder buried at Arolo, Lake Maggiore, Italy. Shannon outlived him by six years.

Ricketts was celebrated in a BBC television programme, Poverty and Oysters, with reminiscences by Kenneth Clark and Cecil Lewis (1979), and a BBC Radio 3 programme, Between Ourselves (1991), with reminiscences by Lewis (by then a nonagenarian) and featuring John Gielgud as Ricketts and T. P. McKenna as Bernard Shaw. Ricketts is portrayed in Michael MacLennan's 2003 play Last Romantics, based on the life of Ricketts, Shannon and their circle, including Wilde and Aubrey Beardsley.

== Gallery ==
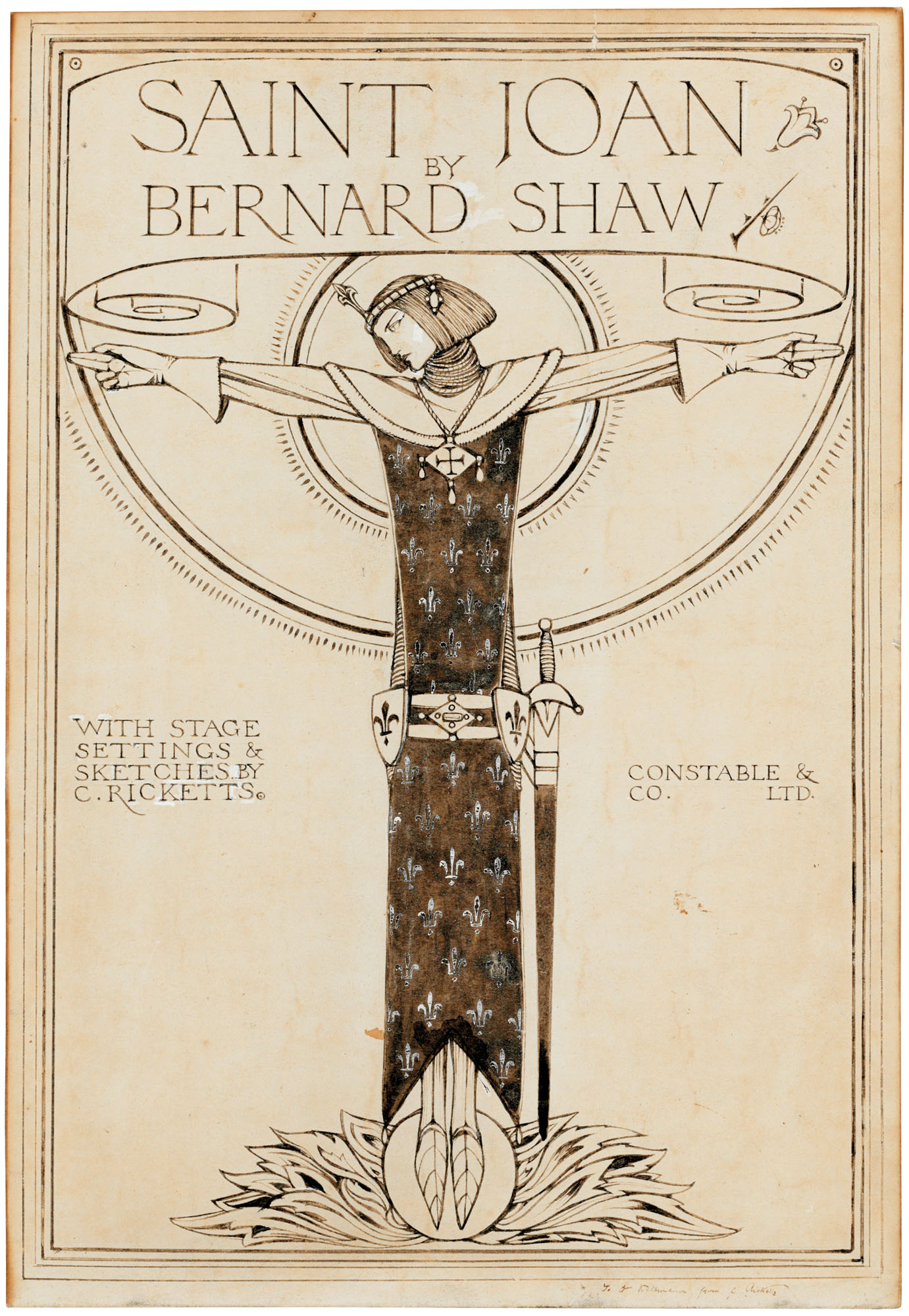
Cover design for Saint Joan

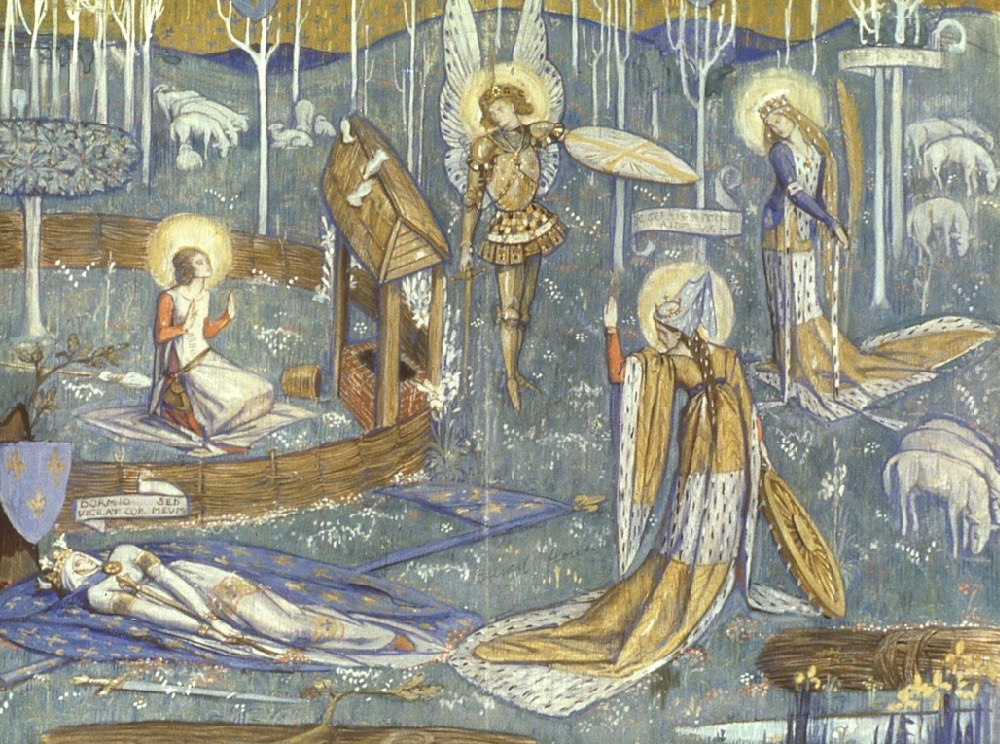
Drop-curtain for Saint Joan (1924)

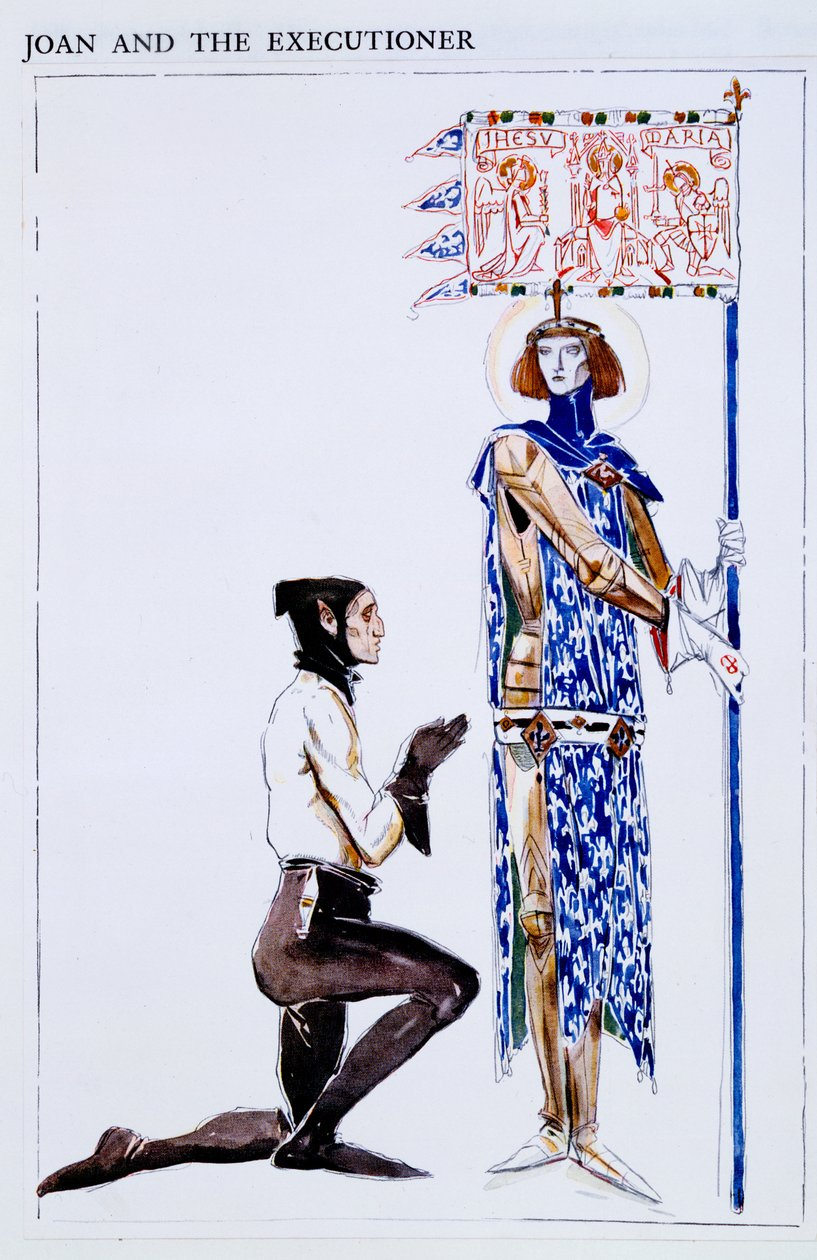
Joan and the Executioner

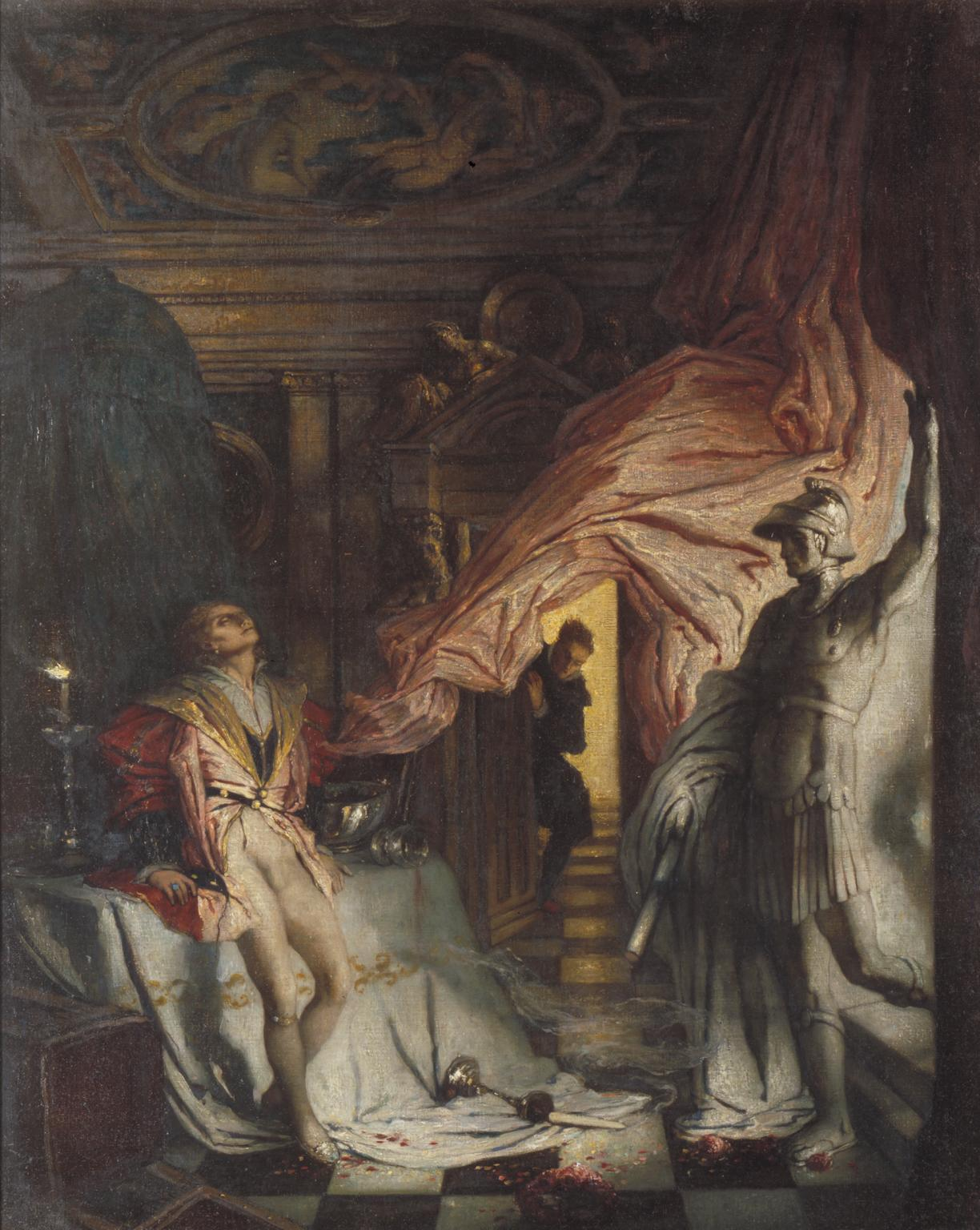
Don Juan (1911)

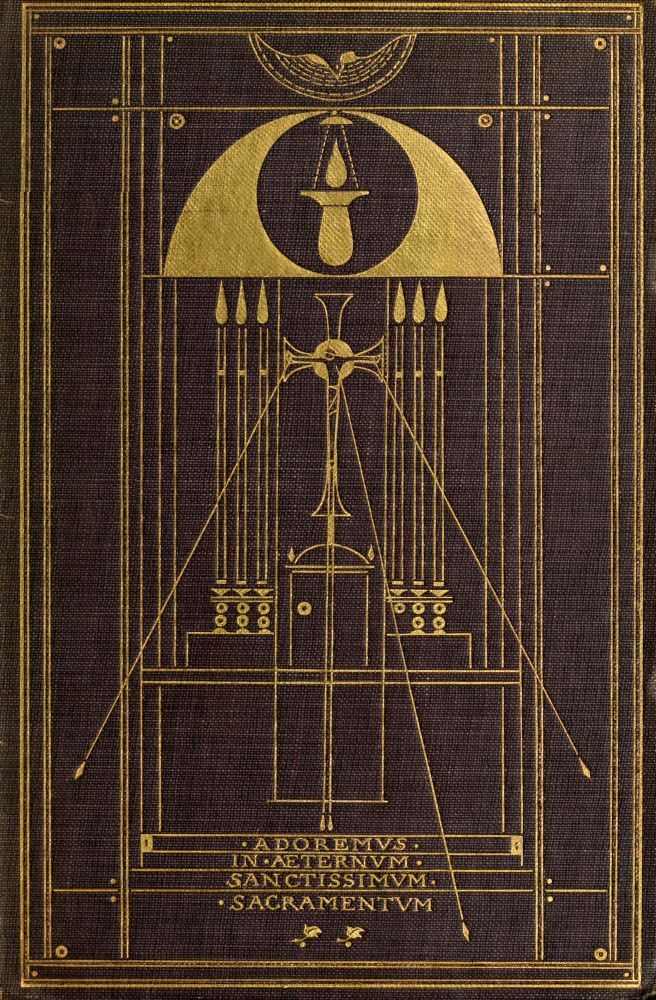
Cover to Michael Field's Poems of Adoration, 1912

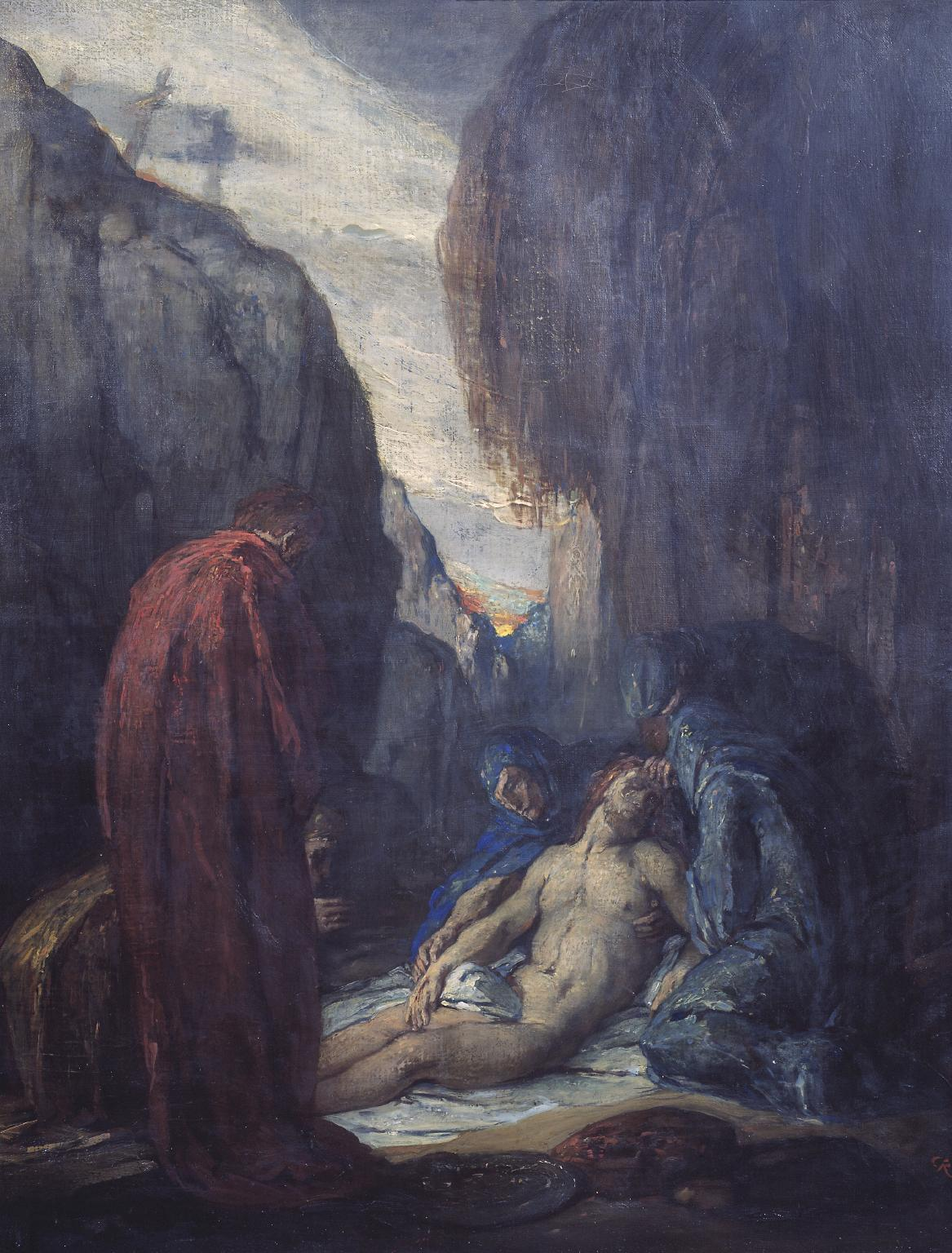
Deposition from the Cross (1915)

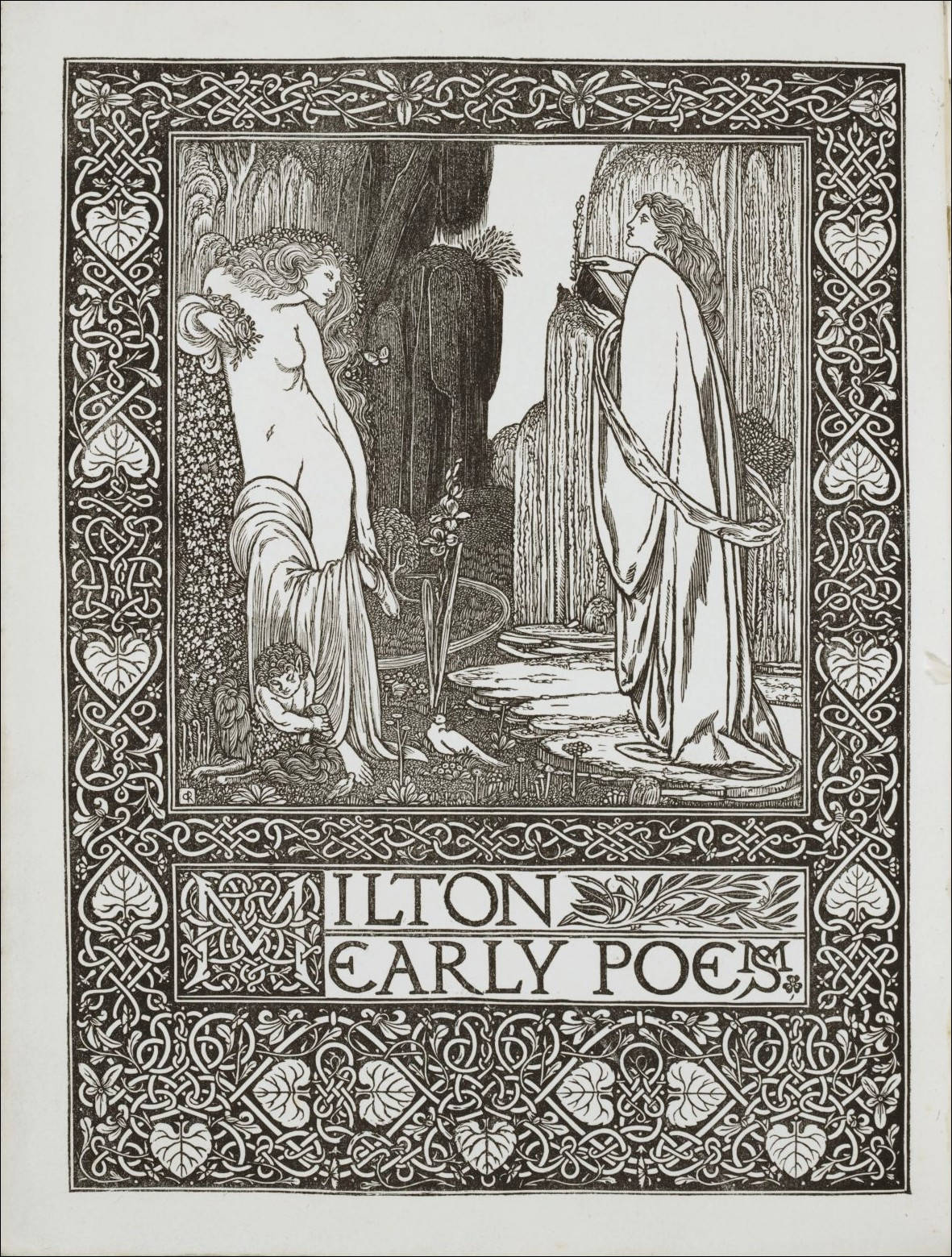
Frontispiece of Milton's Early poems

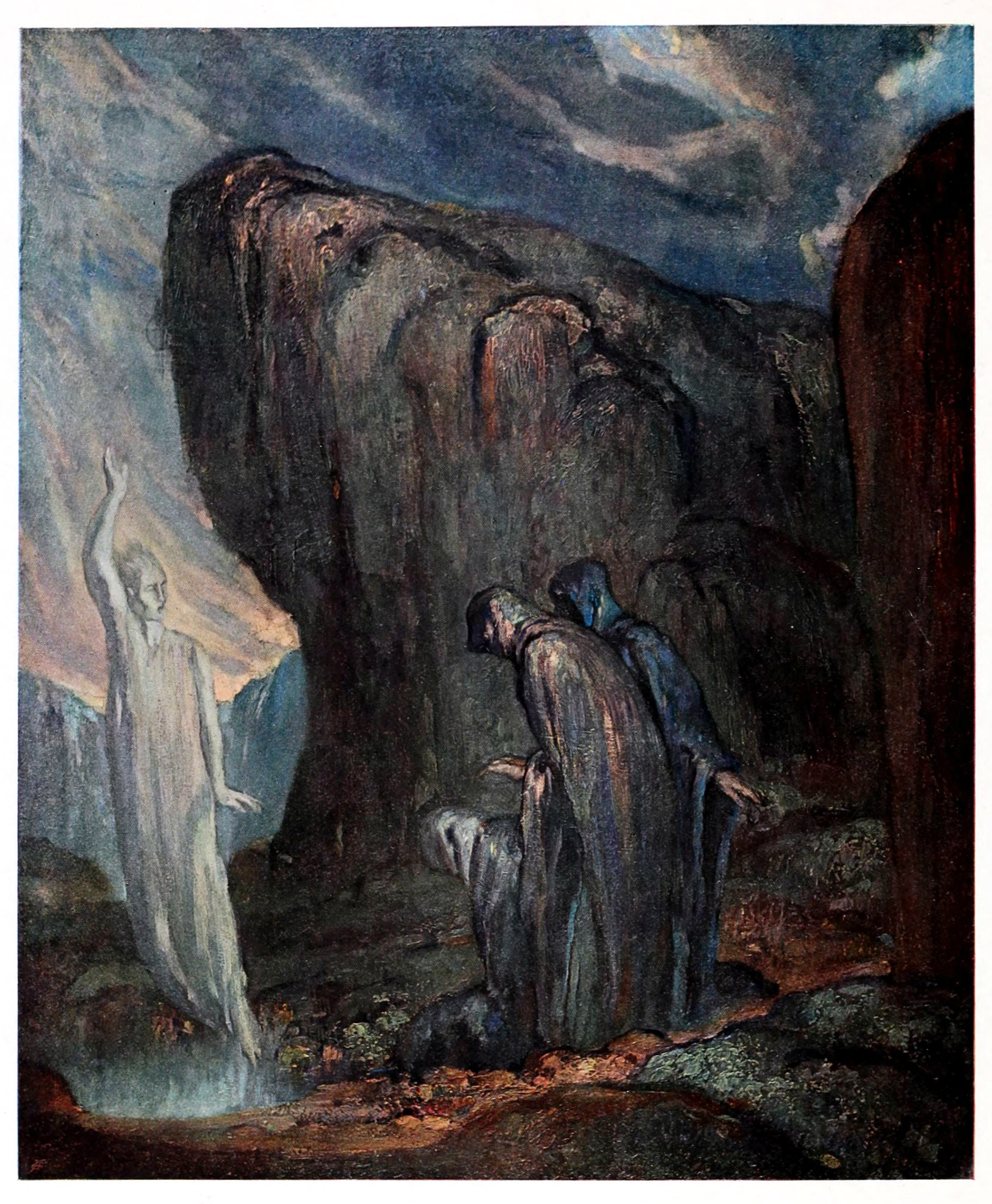
The Holy Women and the Angel of the Resurrection

== Notes, references and sources ==
=== Sources ===
- Bell, Diana (1998). The Complete Gilbert and Sullivan. London: Greenwich Editions. ISBN 978-0-86288-103-0.
- Darracott, Joseph (1979). All for Art: the Ricketts and Shannon Collection, Fitzwilliam Museum, Cambridge. Cambridge and New York: Cambridge University Press. ISBN 978-0-521-22841-1.
- Delaney, J. G. Paul (1990). Charles Ricketts: A Biography. Oxford University Press. ISBN 978-0-198-17212-3.
- Osborne, Harold, ed. (1975). The Oxford Companion to the Decorative Arts. London: Oxford University Press. ISBN 0198661134.
- Ricketts, Charles (1903). The Prado and its Masterpieces. London: Constable. OCLC 927521645. (An expanded version, written for publication in the US in 1907, can be seen at the Internet Archive.)
- Ricketts, Charles (1904). A Bibliography of the Books Issued by Hacon and Ricketts. London: Ricketts. OCLC 1051608423.
- Ricketts, Charles (1910). Titian. London: Methuen. OCLC 670381910.
- Ricketts, Charles (1913). Pages on Art. London: Constable. OCLC 144604213.
- Ricketts, Charles (1939). Cecil Lewis; T. Sturge Moore (eds.). Self-Portrait – Taken from the Letters and Journals of Charles Ricketts. London: Davies. OCLC 255094669.
- Rollins, Cyril; R. John Witts (1962). The D'Oyly Carte Opera Company in Gilbert and Sullivan Operas: A Record of Productions, 1875–1961. London: Michael Joseph. OCLC 504581419.
- Watry, Maureen (2003). The Vale Press: Charles Ricketts, a Publisher in Earnest. New Castle, Delaware: Oak Knoll Press. ISBN 978-1-58456-072-2.
