= Dove Press =

Dove Press may refer to

- Dove Medical Press – An academic publisher of open access, peer-reviewed, scientific and medical journals
- Doves Press – A private press, based in Hammersmith, London, England (1900 – 1916)
