= Edward Prince =

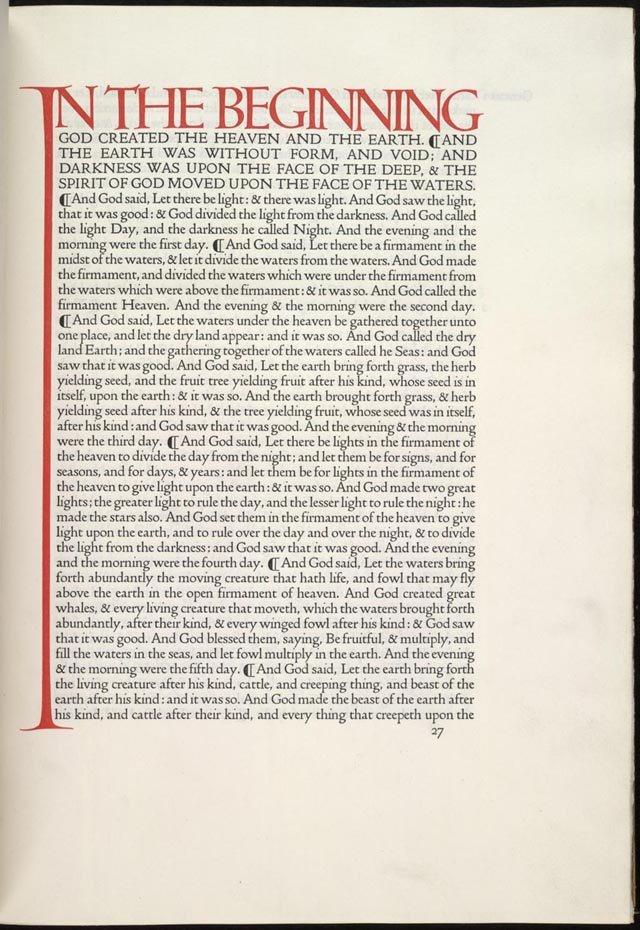
A printing of the Bible from the Doves Press. The body text type is the "Doves Type", cut into metal by Prince.

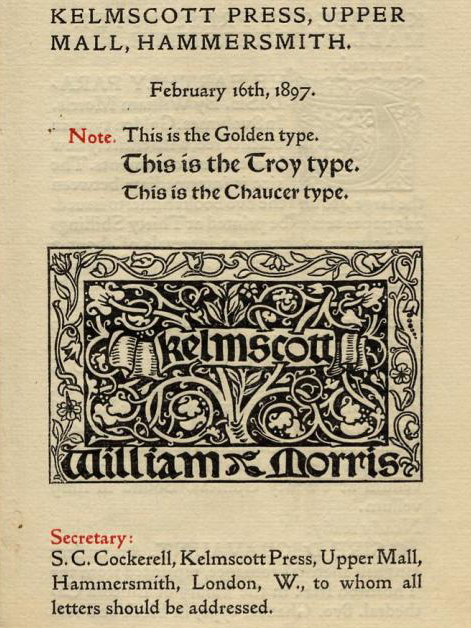
Prince's Golden Type, cut for William Morris, among other typefaces used by the Kelmscott Press.

Edward Philip Prince (1846–1923) was a British engraver and punchcutter, a cutter of the punches used to stamp the matrices used to cast metal type.

Working during the period of the Arts and Crafts movement, after William Morris's Kelmscott Press commissioned him to cut a typeface known as the Golden Type to Morris's design he became known for cutting private typefaces for fine book printing presses. Another client was the Doves Press, whose Doves Type he cut; it was famously thrown into the Thames following a business disagreement. He also worked with the Ashendene Press to cut the Subiaco and Ptolemy types. A somewhat retiring figure, only two photographs of him are known to exist.
