= John Ghazvinian =

American journalist

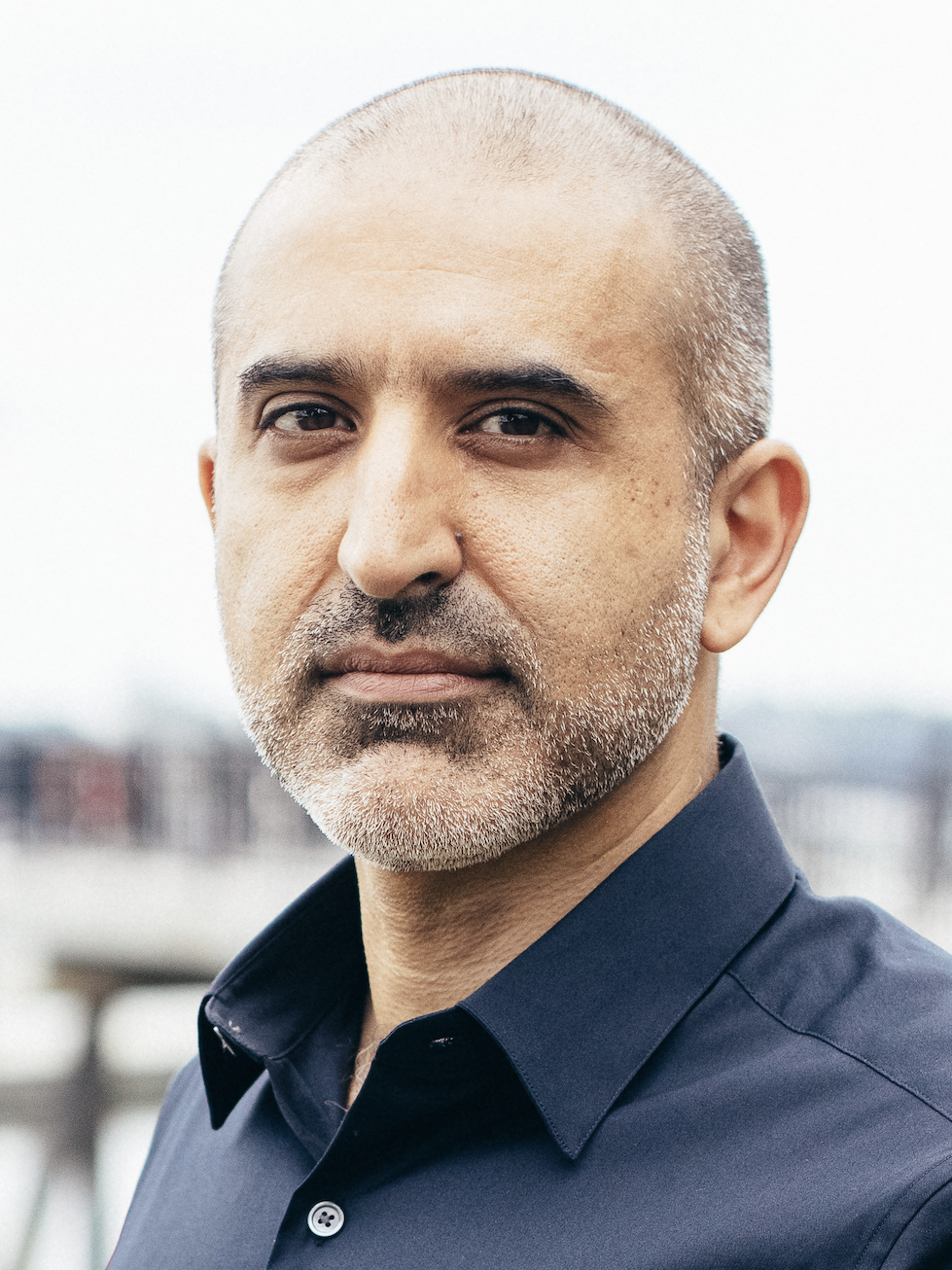
- Born: April 23, 1974 (age 52); Tehran, Iran
- Education: Brown University; Oxford University

John Ghazvinian (Persian: جان قزوینیان, born April 23, 1974) is an Iranian-American author, historian, and former journalist. He is a noted authority on the history of U.S.-Iran relations and is best known for his book, America and Iran: A History, 1720 to the Present – named by The New York Times as one of “100 Notable Books of 2021”.

Ghazvinian is the Executive Director of the Middle East Center at the University of Pennsylvania in Philadelphia. He previously worked as a journalist and has written for Newsweek, The New York Times, The Nation, The Washington Post, The Sunday Times, and Politico. In 2009, he received a high-profile fellowship from the Carnegie Corporation, and in 2016 another fellowship from the National Endowment for the Humanities – both in support of his research on the history of U.S.–Iran relations. He is also the author of Untapped: The Scramble for Africa’s Oil (Harcourt, 2007) and co-editor of American and Muslim Worlds Before 1900 (Bloomsbury, 2020).

== Early life and education ==
Ghazvinian was born in Iran but left with his family at the age of one and was raised in London and Los Angeles. He received his undergraduate degree from Brown University and a masters and doctorate in history from Oxford University. He subsequently worked as a stringer in the London bureau of Newsweek in the early 2000s, where he reported and wrote on a range of stories in the United Kingdom and Western Europe.

From 2006–2007, Ghazvinian was an Andrew W. Mellon Postdoctoral Fellow at the Penn Humanities Forum. In 2007-2009 he was a Senior Fellow in the Center for Programs in Contemporary Writing, at the University of Pennsylvania. He subsequently taught modern Middle East history at several colleges and universities in the Philadelphia area before joining the University of Pennsylvania Middle East Center in January 2018.

Ghazvinian currently resides in Philadelphia.

== Career ==
Ghazvinian's first book, Untapped: The Scramble for Africa's Oil (Harcourt, 2007), an exposé of the petroleum industry in Africa, received widespread praise. Andrew Leonard at Salon wrote that the book "should be must reading for anyone who still believes that unregulated markets are the best way to cure all the ills of the poor nations of the world." The Boston Globe called Untapped a "riveting account and superb analysis of what African oil means to a fuel-hungry world and to the African nations involved." The New York Times called the book "perceptive" and said that it "drills home the point...that a thoughtful strategy to lift the neglected bottom billion must compete against the global oil giants going about their business." In 2007 Untapped was shortlisted for the Barnes & Noble Discover Great New Writers Award.

In 2008, Ghazvinian began work on his most ambitious project – a comprehensive history of U.S.–Iran relations, under contract with Alfred A. Knopf publishers. Based on years of close archival work, in both Iran and the United States, the book was originally more than 1,300 pages in its first draft but had to be cut by more than half to suit commercial publishing imperatives. The final product, America and Iran: A History, 1720 to the Present, was published in January 2021.

The New York Times named America and Iran one of the “100 Notable Books of 2021”, and called it “delightfully readable, genuinely informative and impressively literate.” The Toronto Globe and Mail praised the book as “a compelling and insightful read... a nuanced version of history... [that] eschews headline-grabbing histrionics and makes a much more convincing argument instead – that olive-branch offerings and measured international diplomacy can lead to roads of reconciliation between two sworn enemies.”

The Economist noted that “Mr. Ghazvinian has a witty style.” Library Journal called the book “timely and vividly engaging.” Kirkus Reviews described the book as “an even-handed, revelatory narrative in which the author avoids muddying the waters with an overt political agenda.” Although the book was generally better received among progressives, The American Conservative acknowledged that it was “essential reading for anyone who wants to understand the changing nature of the relationship between our two countries.”

Ambassador John Limbert, who was held hostage in Iran in 1979 and later served as President Barack Obama’s Deputy Secretary of State for Iran, has been particularly positive about the book, which he called “history in the hands of a master”. Limbert noted that “Ghazvinian leads us far beyond the mindless shouting of recent decades to tell a story of friendship, sacrifice and discovery. Should be required reading in both Tehran and Washington.”

Ghazvinian has frequently appeared on CNN, MSNBC, BBC, CGTN, Al-Jazeera, NPR, and other media outlets to discuss his work on the history of U.S.–Iran relations. He has delivered lectures to audiences at the Pentagon, the United Nations, the Smithsonian, the Commonwealth Club of San Francisco, and several World Affairs Councils, as well as dozens of universities and colleges around the United States.
