= William Harcourt Hooper =

British wood-engraver (1834–1912)

William Harcourt Hooper (1834–1912) was a British wood-engraver.

Hooper started his career working for Joseph Swain. In the 1850s, he worked for the weekly newspaper Illustrated London News, as well as artists including Fred Walker, George du Maurier, John Leech, Sir John Tenniel, Lord Leighton, and Sir John Millais.

From 1891–96, he worked for the Kelmscott Press, doing much work for William Morris, and afterwards the Ashendene Press and Essex House Press, where he created engravings of artists' illustrations, particularly those by Burne-Jones, C.M. Gere and C.R. Ashbee.

He taught wood-engraving to Charles Ricketts.

Hooper worked on the Kelmscott Chaucer, the Essex House Psalter and Ashendene's Mazetto Scelto dei Fioretti di San Francesco, Dante and the Morte d'Arthur.

Hooper was the author of A Manual of marks on pottery and porcelain (1894).

St John Hornby called Hooper almost the last of the old school of wood-engravers and a very fine craftsman.

His papers were purchased by the University of Iowa Libraries in 2006.
