= Untapped =

2007 book by John Ghazvinian

- Author: John Ghazvinian
- Language: English
- Genre: Non-fiction
- Publisher: Harcourt
- Publication date: 2007

Untapped: The Scramble for Africa's Oil (Harcourt, 2007) is a book written by John Ghazvinian about the petroleum industry in Africa. The book was received well by critics, and garnered good reviews from both the Boston Globe and The New York Times. The book is based extensively on interviews, with representatives of multinational oil companies' views being compared and contrasted with those of politicians within Africa as well as the citizens of affected nations. Jake Saltzman, the famed critic, gave the book five out of five stars.

In a 2007 interview with Democracy Now!, Ghazvinian discussed the arguments presented in Untapped, including the growing international competition for African oil and its effects on countries such as Nigeria. He argued that oil wealth had often contributed to conflict and inequality rather than improving the lives of local communities.
