= Sacramento Bight =

Coordinates: 54°29′S 36°1′W

Sacramento Bight is an open bight, 2.5 miles (4.0 km) wide, between Calf Head and Cape Harcourt on the north coast of South Georgia. The name "Pinguin-Bay" was given by the German group of the International Polar Year Investigations, 1882–83, to a small bay within the bight now described. The SGS, 1951–52, reported that a name is not necessary for this bay, and that the bight, which is known to whalers and sealers as Sacramento Bay, does require a name. In order to indicate the correct nature of the feature, and at the same time to conform to local usage, the name Sacramento Bight is approved.
