= Harcourt Whyte =

Nigerian composer (1905–1977)

- Born: Ikoli Harcourt-Whyte; 1905; Abonnema, British Nigeria
- Died: 1977 (aged 71–72); Rivers State, Nigeria
- Musical career
- Genre: gospel
- Occupations: vocalist, singer
- Instrument: Vocals
- Years active: 1921–1977

Ikoli Harcourt-Whyte (1905–1977), popularly known as Harcourt Whyte, was a Nigerian composer best remembered for his classic hymn "Atula Egwu."

== Life ==
Ikoli was born in Abonnema in the old Niger Delta region in 1905. He was named Ikoli as a baby by his parents Munabo and Odibo. Between 1915 and 1918, he attended a number of schools including Bishop Crowther Memorial School. He was an active member of the school brass bands and took interest in playing the flute and side-drum. Later on in his life, he adopted the name Harcourt Whyte. His people, the Kalabaris relied on fishing and trading, and Ikoli as a child was trained in these skills. In 1919, he was diagnosed with leprosy after symptoms were first noticed in 1918. In the early 1920s, he was sent to Port Harcourt General Hospital where he developed his talent in music and went on to form a vocalist band with forty other people afflicted with leprosy. In 1932, he was transferred to Uzuakoli Leprosy Hospital, Bende Division, Eastern Nigeria where he met doctor-reverend-musician T.F. Davey from England. Whyte was encouraged by Davey, who took him on village survey tours to collect various traditional sounds. In 1949, after 34 years of ill health, Whyte was finally cured and discharged by Davey as "clean". Whyte dedicated much of his life to the betterment and education of people who suffered the same illness as he once did. He performed sacred compositions inspired by Methodist Church hymns and Wesleyan doctrinal philosophy. His works attracted wide interest and were popular throughout the Igboland, eventually earning him the title of "father of Igbo church music". His career saw him compose over 600 hymns and compositions in the Igbo language.

== Death ==
He died in 1977 in a motor accident.

== Legacy ==
The life of Harcourt Whyte was depicted and some of his hymns were sampled in a 1985 stage play titled Hopes of the Living Dead by Ola Rotimi.

Otuto Nke Chukwu as performed by Harcourt Whyte was sampled in "بنی آدم" and "Champion of the World" in Everyday Life by Coldplay.

== Bibliography ==
- Achinivu Kanu Achinivu (1979). Ikoli Harcourt Whyte: The Man and His Music : a Case of Musical Acculturation in Nigeria. Verlag der Musikalienhandlung K.D. Wagner. ISBN 978-3-921029-67-1.
