= USS Harcourt (1864) =

Gunboat of the United States Navy

History

United States
- Acquired: 14 June 1864
- Out of service: 20 November 1865
- Fate: Sold, 16 April 1867

General characteristics
- Length: 66 ft (20 m)
- Beam: 16 ft 3 in (4.95 m)
- Depth of hold: 7 ft 9 in (2.36 m)
- Propulsion: steam engine; screw-propelled
- Speed: 13 knots (24 km/h; 15 mph)
- Armament: not known

USS Harcourt was a small steamship acquired by the Union Navy during the American Civil War. She was placed into service as a tugboat and assigned to the blockade of ports of the Confederate States of America.

While on blockade duty, she performed other services, as required, such as patrolling and carrying personnel back and forth between ships and shore and providing the services of a dispatch boat.

== Service history ==
Harcourt, a screw tug, was purchased by the Navy at New York City from a private owner 14 June 1864. Her first commanding officer was Acting Ensign J. A. Chadwick. After a brief period as dispatch boat at Hampton Roads, Virginia, Harcourt was ordered 31 July 1864 to Beaufort, North Carolina, to serve the North Atlantic Blockading Squadron as a pilot tug. She remained at Beaufort carrying pilots to and from ships in the harbor until returning to Norfolk, Virginia, for repairs in November 1864. She later spent a brief period as a patrol boat on the James River in March 1865, and in April assisted in towing the hulk of former CSS Albemarle, the formidable ram sunk in Albemarle Sound 27 October 1864 by Lt. W. B. Gushing, to Norfolk Navy Yard, where she arrived 27 April. Harcourt performed various tug duties in Hampton Roads until placed in ordinary 20 November 1865. She was sold at Norfolk on 16 April 1867.
