= Harcourt Island =

Coordinates: 54°29′S 35°58′W

Harcourt Island is a small island at the north side of the entrance to Royal Bay, South Georgia. It was named by the UK Antarctic Place-Names Committee in 1971 after Cape Harcourt, the easternmost point of this island.

== See also ==
- List of Antarctic and sub-Antarctic islands
