= Ashendene Press =

Private press (1895–1935) based in Chelsea, London

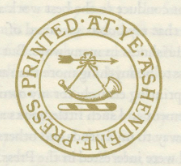
Watermark of the Hornby family crest used by the Ashendene Press

The Ashendene Press was a small private press founded by St John Hornby (1867–1946). It operated from 1895 to 1915 in Chelsea, London and was revived after the war in 1920. The press closed in 1935. Its peers included the Kelmscott Press and the Doves Press. Hornby became friends with William Morris and Emery Walker, who helped inspire his work. These three presses were part of a "revival of fine printing" that focused on treating bookmaking as fine art. The Ashendene Press was famous for producing high-quality works by Dante. Ashendene books had excellent bindings and focused more on pleasure than reform than the other private presses of the time, though one review claims that the Ashendene Press was the most successful private press in recapturing the essence of fifteenth-century printing. Ashendene books were carefully printed with large margins, and despite their lack of extravagant decoration, they were considered spectacular works of art. Two original typefaces were created for the Ashendene Press: Subiaco and Ptolemy. They were known for handwritten, colored initials by Graily Hewitt. The press' main customers were book collectors who paid for a subscription for Ashendene books.

== History ==
The printing press was originally set up in Hornby's father's estate, Ashendene, where his sisters, brother, and cousin could assist in printing the press' first books. Printing was a hobby for Hornby; he undertook the project solely for the pleasure it would bring him. Hornby moved the Ashendene Press with him when he moved to Shelley House, Chelsea, London in 1899. It closed for five years in 1915 but resumed printing from 1920 until 1935.

Hornby was greatly influenced and inspired by the work of the Kelmscott Press and the Doves Press, both in his decision to start the Ashendene Press and in his artistic choices. These three presses are considered part of the Private Press Movement and the larger Arts and Crafts Movement in England at the end of the 19th century, though for Hornby, printing was always a hobby to be enjoyed rather than a venue for reform. Each of these presses produced books that were considered works of art, though the Ashendene Press produced books of excellent quality inspired by fifteenth-century printing practices.

The wood engraver William Harcourt Hooper worked for them from about 1896. Edward Prince, who also worked with the Kelmscott and Doves presses, cut types for Ashendene. Emery Walker worked with Hornby to design the press' two original types. Hornby worked with Sydney Cockerell to analyze the historic typefaces on which the Ashendene Press faces were based. Eric Gill, Graily Hewitt, Charles Gere, and Gwen Raverat were other artists who worked for the press. The illustrator Florence Kingsford Cockerell illuminated an Ashendene edition of The Song of Songs Which Is Solomon's in 1901, varying the designs for each of the 40-odd copies in the edition.

Hornby used Albion presses. He used paper from J. Batchelor & Sons and vellum from H. Band & Co. Ashendene books were bound by Zaehnsdorf initially and later were done by the W. H. Smith bindery.

The press' main customers were book collectors who paid for a subscription for Ashendene books. In addition to his impressive books, Hornby was known to print announcements, menus, and Christmas cards. Before the press closed in 1935, Hornby printed a farewell notice to his subscribers announcing that A Descriptive Bibliography of the Books Printed at the Ashendene Press would be the last book. Bridwell Library now holds archives for the Ashendene Press in their special collections, a collection that includes papers, original designs, manuscripts, correspondence, ledgers, and folios.

== Design ==
Initially, Hornby used typefaces of the Fell type, but most Ashendene editions used one of two typefaces which were specially cast for the Press: Subiaco and, to a lesser extent, Ptolemy. Subiaco was based on a fifteenth-century Italian type cast by Arnold Pannartz and Konrad Sweynheim. Morris originally planned to design a type based on Pannartz and Sweynheim's work, but abandoned the project. Hornby, who didn't consider himself a designer, paid for the project to be completed, named the type as Subiaco, and used it in the Ashendene Press for more than 20 years. The original Pannartz and Sweynheim type had rather gothic characteristics but the Ashendene version eliminated the long "s" and completely redesigned the "k," "w" and "y." The typeface Ptolemy was created for the press's edition of Don Quixote and was based on the type used for a printing of Ptolemy's Geographia in 1482. Ptolemy was cut mechanically, unlike Subiaco which had been cut by hand by Edward Prince. Of the two types, Subiaco was darker but Ptolemy was more readable. Today, both Subiaco and Ptolemy are owned by Cambridge University Press.

Many Ashendene books featured printer's marks. One of Hornby's marks depicted two men working a printing press and read "Les hommes sont mechants mais leurs livres sont bons". [The men are bad but their books are good]. The books also featured handwritten initials by Graily Hewitt and other artists. Some Ashendene books, such as that by St. Francis of Assisi, were illustrated with wood-engravings, but the majority were printed solely using type.

== Works ==
=== Tutte le Opere di Dante Alighieri ===
Hornby dedicated almost a decade to printing Dante's works. The first appearance of the Subiaco type was in 1905 when the press printed Dante's Inferno. The Ashendene Inferno received high praise in the New York Times from Theodore de Vinne, who said that Subiaco was "the most satisfactory reproduction of a fifteenth-century face that has yet appeared." Four years later, the Ashendene Press published the complete works of Dante under the title Tutte le Opere di Dante Alighieri, also in Subiaco, which is considered to be one of the greatest works by an English private press along with the Kelmscott's Chaucer and the Doves' Bible for its precision, clearness, readability, and artistry. The press printed 6 copies on vellum and 105 copies on paper. The text on each page was divided into two columns and featured red print for initials, headings, and notes. Paper copies were printed on Batchelor's paper with Ashendene's bugle watermark.

=== Poems Written in the Year MCMXII by Robert Bridges Poet-Laureate ===
Robert Bridges had previously published his works with the Daniel Press, but in 1915 he reached out to the Ashendene Press with twelve new poems. Hornby had a reputation for excellent printing that Bridges trusted enough with his new work. This publication was the press' only work of literary significance since it was the original printing of these poems. Some copies featured blue initials, some red, others only black. The book was printed in quarto size and bound in blue paper boards with linen backing. Eighty-five copies were printed on paper and six on vellum, but none were for sale. Bridges had requested only enough copies for him to give to his friends.

=== Daphnis et Chloé ===
The press experienced ruin when their first attempt at printing Daphnis et Chloé on Japanese vellum was folded before the ink had dried completely. The Descriptive Bibliography of the Ashendene Press featured a leaf from this ruined printing. Daphnis et Chloé was reprinted on Batchelor paper in 1933. This edition featured blue initials by Hewitt, wood engravings by Raverat, and Monotype Pastonic italic, a typeface not used by the Ashendene Press elsewhere. Two hundred and ninety copies were printed on paper and bound with green paper boards while twenty copies were printed on vellum and bound in blue or green pigskin.

=== Bibliography ===
This is a list of books printed, published, or sold by the Ashendene Press. The years listed refer to the year the book was printed by the Ashendene Press, not necessarily the year it was initially published.

St. Francis of Assisi, I fioretti del glorioso poverello di Cristo, printed by the Ashendene Press, 1922.

- The Journal of Joseph Hornby, February–March 1815 (1895)
- La Vita Nuova by Dante (1895)
- Ye Minutes of ye CLXXVIIthe Meeting of ye Sette of Odd Volumes (1896)
- Three Poems of John Milton (1896)
- Rubaiyat of Omar Khayyam (1896)
- The Thoughts of Marcus Aurelius Antoninus (1897)
- The Book of Ecclesiastes (1897)
- Two Essays of Francis Lord Bacon (1897)
- The Prologue to the Tales of Caunterbury by Geoffrey Chaucer (1897)
- Three Elegies: Lycidas, Adonais, Thyris (1899)
- The Song-Story of Aucassin and Nicolete translated by Andrew Lang (1900)
- The Boke off the Revelacion off Sanct Jhon the Devine (1901)
- Inferno by Dante (1902-1905)
- The Song of Solomon (1902)
- Quinti Horati Flacci Alcaica; Carmina Sapphica (1903)
- A Treatyse of Fysshynge wyth an Angle (1903)
- A Book of Songs and Poems from the Old Testament and the Apocrypha (1904)
- Un Mazzetto Scelto di Certi Fioretti di San Francesco (1904)
- Purgatorio di Dante (1904)
- Paradiso di Dante (1905)
- Utopia by Thomas More (1906)
- The Story without an End (1909)
- Tutte le Opere di Dante Alighieri (1909)
- Publii Vergilii Maronis Opera (1910)
- Morte Darthur by Sir Thomas Malory (1912)
- T. Lucreti Cari de Rerum Natura (1913)
- Poems Written in the Year MCMXII by Robert Bridges Poet-Laureate (1915)
- Il Decameron di Giovanni Boccaccio (1920)
- Refugees in Chelsea by Henry James (1920)
- Vita di S. Chiara Vergine by Ugolino Verino (1921)
- I Fioretti di S. Francesco by St. Francis of Assisi (1922)
- The Faerie Queen by Edmund Spenser (1923)
- The Golden Asse of Lucius Apuleius (1924)
- The Young King & Other Tales by Oscar Wilde (1924)
- The Minor Poems by Edmund Spenser (1925)
- The History of Don-Quixote by Miguel de Cervantes (1927-1928)
- Thucydides: History of the Peloponnesian War translated by B. Jowett (1930)
- The Book of Ecclesiasticus (1932)
- Les amours pastorales de Daphnis et Chloe by Longus (1933)
- A Descriptive Bibliography of the Books Printed at The Ashendene Press (1935)

== See also ==
- Image of Ashendene's edition of The Faerie Queene, located at the University of Wisconsin–Milwaukee.
- The Double Crown Club
- Bridwell Library's Special Collections, located at Southern Methodist University
