= Cape Harcourt =

Cape in South Georgia and the South Sandwich Islands

Cape Harcourt (54°29′S 35°58′W) is a headland on the eastern extremity of Harcourt Island on the north coast of South Georgia, forming the north side of the entrance to Royal Bay. The name dates back to at least 1920 and is now well established. Sacramento Bight lies on the coast between Cape Harcourt and Calf Head.
