= Cockerell =

Cockerell is a surname, and may refer to:

== People ==
- Allan Cockerell (1891–1975), New Zealand soldier and politician
- Catherine Cockerell Cobb (1903–1995), British jeweler, silversmith, daughter of Douglas
- Charles Robert Cockerell (1788–1863), British architect, son of Samuel
- Christabel Cockerell (1860–1903), British artist
- Christopher Cockerell (1910–1999), British inventor of the hovercraft, son of Sydney
- Douglas Cockerell (1870–1945), British bookbinder, brother of Sydney
- Florence Kingsford Cockerell (1871–1949), English illustrator and calligrapher, wife of Sydney
- Frederick Pepys Cockerell (1833–1878), British architect
- John Cockerell (1845–1937), English football player
- Mark Cockerell, American figure skater
- Michael Cockerell (born 1940), British maker of political documentaries
- Olive Juliet Cockerell (1868–1910), English artist and illustrator, sister of Sydney
- Samuel Pepys Cockerell (1754–1827), British architect
- Stanley Cockerell (1895–1940), World War I flying ace
- Sydney Cockerell (1867–1962), British museum curator and secretary to William Morris, brother of Theodore, husband of Florence
- Theodore Dru Alison Cockerell (1866–1948), zoologist, husband of Wilmatte, brother of Sydney
- Wilmatte Porter Cockerell (1869–1957), botanist, entomologist and teacher, wife of Theodore

== Fictional characters ==
- Cockerell (character), a character in Cornelia Funke's novel Inkheart

== See also ==
- Cockerell Peninsula, a peninsula in Antarctica
- Cockerel, another name for a rooster
- Cockerill, a surname
