= Catherine Cobb =

British jeweller and silversmith (1903–1995)

- Born: Catherine Cockerell; 28 March 1903; England
- Died: 17 September 1995 (aged 92)
- Other names: Casty Cobb
- Spouse: Arthur Cobb (m. 1937)
- Children: 3 daughters and 1 son
- Parent(s): Douglas Cockerell; Florence Arundel
- Relatives: Sydney Cockerell (uncle), Florence Kate Kingsford (aunt), Christopher Cockerell (cousin)

Catherine "Casty" Cobb (née Cockerell; 28 March 1903 – 17 September 1995) was a British jeweller and silversmith, she was from an established Art and Crafts family.

== Early life, education and marriage ==
Catharine Cockerell was born on 28 March 1903 to Florence Arundel and Douglas Cockerell. Her father was a bookbinder and her mother was a jewelry maker who inspired her to work with metal. Her patermal uncle Sydney was director of the Fitzwilliam Museum in Cambridge and knew both William Morris and John Ruskin. Nicknamed "Casty" by her classmates at the Central School, Cockerell learned jewelry and silversmithing during the 1920s. She became friends with Joyce Clissold, a textile printer, and later took over a space in the Footprints textile workshop which Clissold took over from its founders.

In 1937, she married Arthur Cobb and became known as Catherine Cobb. She had one son and three daughters. Her legacy as a jeweller continues in her granddaughter Abi Cochran who is also a jeweller having started to learn at her grandmother's knee.

The Cobbs moved to Cambridge during the Second World War where she taught drawing and design and well as jewelry at Cambridge Technical College. She continued to teach jewelry at her house in Trumpington up until just a few months before her death aged 92, sharing the benefits of her excellent collection of tools and her enthusiasm for the subject. When her children had grown up she began examining in art for the University of Cambridge Local Examination Syndicate, often travelling with the potter Charlotte Bawden. She was sent to Malaya, Africa, and India.

== Career ==
=== Jewelry and silversmithing ===
Cobb began taking on orders for individuals and worked at Cameo Corner, a jewellery shop near the British Museum.

Her work falls into three categories: First, jewellery, often using found objects like garnets from a Scottish stream and materials of low value (for example safety pins). Second, she also supplied silver clasps and other ornaments for bookbindings for the Cockerell Bindery which was carried on by her sibling Sydney. Third, her most individual contribution was her silver pique work on ivory and ebony. This consists of hammering silver wire into holes pierced in the base material to make tiny silver spots arranged in simple patterns. She made boxes and cruet sets, but particularly cutlery. After World War 1, she realised the likely demand for fine stainless steel table knives since the servants to polish the previously used silver knives no longer existed. She made knives and forks with steel elements forged in Sheffield to her design, to which she added her distinctive pique handles.

Cobb was a member of the Art Workers Guild and the Red Rose Guild.

=== Puppetry ===
In the late 1920s and early 1930s, Cobb became interested in puppetry. She found some Punch and Judy puppets in the family attic and Clissold printed fabric for a "set-up" and in the summer of the 1930s they took their Punch and Judy show on tour around Buckinghamshire and along the south coast. Around the same time she began to assist sculptor William Simmonds. She worked in his woodcarving workshop in the Cotswolds, and behind the scenes of his critically acclaimed puppet shows which were performed in front of the Duke of Westminster and Winston Churchill.

== Legacy ==
Cobb's work is in the collections of:

- Crafts Study Centre at Farnham, Surrey
- Worshipful Company of Goldsmiths

=== Exhibitions ===
- Women's Work (2019) Ditchling Museum of Art + Craft, Sussex

== Ancestry ==
Ancestors of Catherine Cobb

Sydney Cockerell
Douglas Cockerell
John Bennett
Alice Bennett
Agnes Willson
Catherine Cobb
Florence Arundel
