= Cockerill =

Cockerill is a surname. Notable people with the surname include:

== Sport and sportsmen ==
- Callum Cockerill-Mollett, English footballer
- Glenn Cockerill, English football manager
- Harry Cockerill (footballer) (1894–1960), English footballer
- John Cockerill (footballer), British football player
- Kay Cockerill, American golfer
- Mike Cockerill, Australian football journalist
- Richard Cockerill, English rugby player
- Ricky Cockerill, New Zealander figure skater
- Ron Cockerill, English football player
- Samuel Cockerill, English cricketer

== Other people ==
- Harry Cockerill (1899–1987), Australian politician
- John Cockerill (industrialist), British businessman and founder of John Cockerill & Cie. (later SA John Cockerill), son of William
- Joseph R. Cockerill, U.S. Representative
- George K. Cockerill (1867–1957), British Army officer and Conservative Member of Parliament for Reigate 1918–1931
- George Cockerill (journalist) (1871–1943), Australian journalist and write
- William Cockerill, British entrepreneur of the Industrial Revolution

== See also ==
- Cockerell
- Cockerill (disambiguation)
