= William Simmonds =

William Simmonds may refer to:

- William Simmonds (craftsman) (1876–1968), English draftsman, artist and craftsman
- William Simmonds (cricketer) (1892–1957), English cricketer
- William Simmonds Chatterley (1787–1822), English actor
- W. H. Simmonds (William Henry Simmonds, 1860–1934), newspaper editor in Tasmania
