= Sangorski & Sutcliffe =

English bookbinding firm

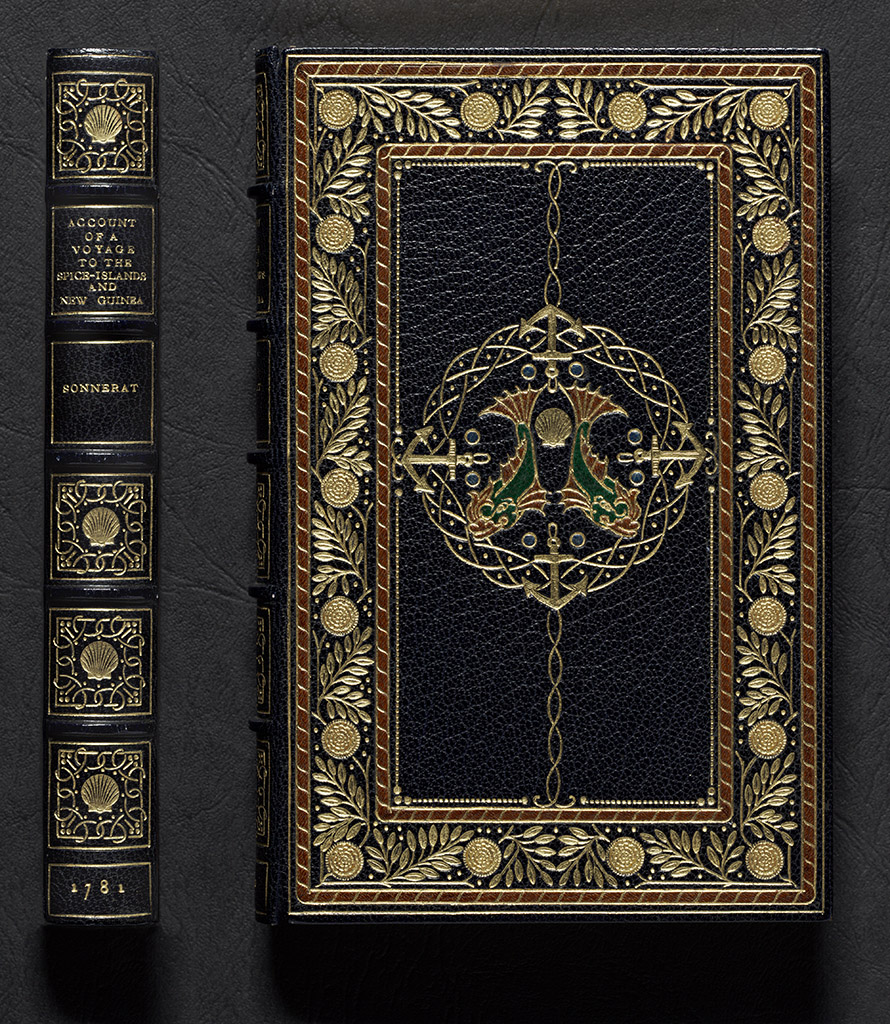
Upper cover and spine of Pierre Sonnerat's ‘Voyage to the Spice Islands’, bound by Sangorski & Sutcliffe in 1913

Sangorski & Sutcliffe is a firm of bookbinders established in London in 1901. It is considered to be one of the most important bookbinding companies of the 20th century, famous for its luxurious jeweled bindings that used real gold and precious stones in their book covers.

== History ==
Sangorski & Sutcliffe was established by Francis Sangorski (1875–1912) and George Sutcliffe (1878–1943). They had met in 1896 at a bookbinding evening class taught by Douglas Cockerell at the London County Council's Central School of Arts and Crafts.

In 1898, Sangorski and Sutcliffe each won one of the ten annual craft scholarship awards, giving them £20 a year for three years to continue their training as apprentice bookbinders. They were employed at Cockerell's own bindery, and began to teach bookbinding at Camberwell College of Art. They were laid off in 1901 after a coal strike caused an economic slump, and they decided to set up on their own in a rented attic in Bloomsbury, starting on 1 October 1901. They soon moved to Vernon Place, and then, in 1905, to Southampton Row.

Sangorski's elder brother, Alberto Sangorski (1862–1932), worked for the firm. He became an accomplished calligrapher and illuminator, working for Rivière from 1910.

They quickly revived the art of jewelled bookbindings, decorating their sumptuous multi-colour leather book bindings with gold inlay and precious and semi-precious jewels. They were commissioned to create a most luxurious binding of the Rubaiyat of Omar Khayyam, the front cover of which was adorned with three golden peacocks with jewelled tails and surrounded by heavily tooled and gilded vines, that was sent on the ill-fated RMS Titanic in 1912. The book, known as the Great Omar, sank with the ship and has not been recovered. Shortly afterwards, in July 1912, Sangorski drowned at Selsey Bill on the south coast of England.

Sutcliffe continued the firm, which became recognised as one of the leading bookbinders in London. The bindery moved to Poland Street, and managed to survive through the First World War, the Great Depression, the Second World War, and post-war austerity. In this period, it undertook work for the Ashendene Press, Golden Cockerel Press and the J. & E. Bumpus bookshop. It also created miniature books for Queen Mary's Dolls' House.

After Sutcliffe suffered a stroke in 1936, he entrusted the business to his nephew, Stanley Bray (1907–1995), who had worked for his uncle since 1926. The company merged with HT Woods in 1939, bringing Kenneth Hobson to the firm. He introduced a more modern style of binding. Bray inherited the company on Sutcliffe's death in 1943. The firm merged again in 1988, joining with Zaehnsdorf's bindery in Bermondsey (established by Joseph Zaehnsdorf in 1842).

A second copy of the Omar Khayyam was bound as World War II broke out and this was placed in a bank safe vault for safe keeping, but enemy bombing destroyed the vault and the second copy. Stanley Bray, after his retirement, made a third version of the binding using the original design; this is now in the British Library.

The combined business was bought by Asprey in 1985 and renamed SSZ Limited. Shepherds, a bookbinding company, bought the company from Asprey in 1998, and revived the Sangorski & Sutcliffe name. The bindery moved from its premises in Bermondsey to Rochester Row.

== Sources ==
- http://www.bookbinding.co.uk/History.htm
- http://www.independent.co.uk/news/people/obituarystanley-bray-1322465.html Obituary of Stanley Bray, 5 January 1996
- bbc.co.uk
