= School social work =

Social work performed in educational contexts

School social work is a specialized area of social work concerned with the psychosocial functioning of students to promote and maintain their health and well-being while assisting students to access their academic potential. The School Social Work Association of America defines school social workers as "trained mental health professionals who can assist with mental health concerns, behavioral concerns, positive behavioral support, academic, and classroom support, consultation with teachers, parents, and administrators as well as provide individual and group counseling/therapy."

Some of the roles of school social workers include psycho-social assessment and intervention, student and family counseling, adaptive behavior assessment, recreational therapies, health education, assessing social and developmental histories of students with disabilities, identifying students at-risk, integrating community resources into schools, advocacy, case management for identifying students in need of help and to promote systematic change within a school system, crisis intervention and conflict resolution.

== History ==
=== United Kingdom ===
Margaret Frere, who ran a poor school in inner London, realised in 1898 that despite volunteers handing out dinners, clothing, and shoes, poor children remained under fed and badly clothed. She realised that unless the homes were visited and assisted then there was no permanent improvement.

In 1914 London County Council decided to create a school care service that would be modelled on her "Charitable Funds Committees". Frere had come to believe that a care service should "unite the home with the school education". The new school care service relied on volunteers but they were initially organised by two women employed by London County Council and Helen Nussey was one of them. Theodora Morton was their boss and head of the new service.

In 1939 there were 158 employed staff and 5,000 volunteers servicing every elementary school in London.

=== United States ===
School social work in America began during the school year 1907–08 and was established simultaneously in New York City, Boston, Chicago and New Haven, Connecticut. At its inception, school social workers were known, among other things, as advocates for new immigrants and welfare workers of equity and fairness for people of lower socioeconomic class as well as home visitors. This unheralded and extensive process led to the expansion of school social work services with the encouragement of the community.

By 1900 over two-thirds of the states had compulsory attendance laws and by 1918, each state had passed compulsory school attendance laws based on the philosophy of inclusion, making school attendance obligatory by rights, and as a privilege of equal opportunity for those with individual differences (including differences in rate of learning). These pupil personnel workers or attendance workers were replaced by visiting teachers by the 1920s, they were later called as school-based caseworkers. They made different emphases and methods in their work. E.g. Special schools, Psycho-social assessment and referrals and family based intervention.

A 1917 study of truancy in Chicago supported "findings that the need for school attendance officers who understood the social ills of the community" and school social workers were best equipped for that responsibility (Allen-Meares, 1996, p. 25). Mary Richmond, one of the founding figures of social work, devoted an entire chapter to the visiting teacher in her 1922 book on What is Social Casework? The testing movement influenced school social work growth as well. Through the testing movement, educators were gaining knowledge about individual differences, underscoring the need for some children to attend school, children whose social conditions related to their test scores. Lastly during this time, leaders in the field like Sophonisba Breckinridge, expressed concerns of how school and education would relate to future success and happiness, and expressed the need to connect school and home in order to relate to the needs of children.

Later in the 1920s, with the mental hygiene movement school social work was concerned with treating nervous disorders and behavioral problems in difficult children and prevention of social maladjustment, this was the beginning of therapeutic role for school social workers. During the Great Depression in the 1930s, like school counseling, school social work also declined. The Fair Labor Standards Act of 1938 sought social work efforts to be initiated in the schools.

From the 1940–1960 case work and group work in schools had become an established specialty. In 1960, pupil-personnel laws called for a greater emphasis by school social workers on the development of school policies and reforms. School social workers were affected by the governmental reforms and education research. Like school counselors, social workers were now called upon to address student needs while also addressing the sources of student troubles within the school. The school social worker was considered as an expert by then, who could help schools on varying psychosocial issues.

During the 1970s, school social work gave more emphasis on family, community, collaborative approach with teachers and others school personnel. In 1975, the United States passed the Education for All Handicapped Children Act (EAHC, P.L. 94-142). It gave special importance to the role of School social work services. The legislation was later renamed as the Individuals with Disabilities Education Act in 1990. In the latter part of the 1970s, inflation was rising at an alarming rate and budget cuts threatened the profession of school social work, especially as many social workers were being replaced by other school personnel claiming similar roles. The National Association of Social Work (NASW) published a newsletter to bring attention to the issue and get responses from practitioners. Through this, NASW conducted research and replicated the findings of others' studies on the roles of school social workers and models of practice, and school social work continued to expand.

In the 1980s, school social workers were included as "qualified personnel" in many pieces of legislation, especially in the Elementary and Secondary School Improvement Amendments of 1988. These led to NASW giving more attention to the profession and more service to meet the needs of the category. NASW's active participation in the profession eventually led to a school social worker credential with exams in 1992. Since then, there has been a trend of integrative collaborative services. In 1994, school social workers were included in American Education Act. In July 1994 64 school social workers from across the USA, and spearheaded by the Midwest School Social Work Council, met in Edwardsville, Illinois and formed the School Social Work Association of America. They drafted the first constitution and by-laws for the organization. In June 2009, a second national organization incorporated, the American Council for School Social Work, after reviewing the direction of the profession and concluding that a stronger, enhanced national voice would benefit the profession.

=== Germany ===
School social work in Germany began in the 1970s. The German term for school social work "Schulsozialarbeit". It dealt with helping students with social skills, interpersonal relations, and personal growth. Initially it was an institutionalized form of both school and youth welfare for providing underprivileged children support regarding healthy socialization and adjustment in school for rising above the demands of school settings. German school social workers find solution to problems in school environment and personal ones of students. The German Youth Institute provided the first social work training with school social work concentration. Apart from this the changing social and economic paradigms of the 21st century that affects lives of families as wells as of children rises the importance of school social work in German pedagogy.

=== India ===
School social work in India was officially recognized by Government of India in the 21st century. From the 1970s, school social workers were prominent in elite schools, adopting the American model of school counseling, based on the client or person centered approach of Carl Rogers and others. The main objective was whole welfare of the child. Central Board of Secondary Education refers to school social workers as Health Wellness Teachers, while the Integrated Child Protection Scheme (ICPS) strictly enforces requirement of a School Social Worker and School Counselor. The psycho-social service scheme instituted under ICPS in Kerala with the guidance of a child development center (CDC) have contracted social workers for 800 schools to provide the professional services. The services are limited to only teenage girls, and excludes boys from equal rights to access of the program.

== School social work values ==
Florence Poole in 1949 described a school social worker as a skilled worker required to determine which needs within the school can be met through school social work service. A school social worker must develop a method of offering the service that will fit with the general organization and structure of the school, and which could be identified as using social work knowledge and skill. They must define the service and their contribution so that the school personnel can accept it as a service that contributes to the major purpose of the school.

The values that school social work upholds are:

- Each pupil is valued as an individual regardless of any unique characteristic.
- Each pupil should be allowed to be participate in the learning process.
- Individual differences should be recognized; intervention should be aimed at guiding pupils' goals with educational support to train them to the life to which they look forward.
- Each child, regardless of race and socioeconomic characteristics, has a right to equal treatment in the school.

The National Association of Social Workers in the U.S. provides a code of ethics for school social work professionals.

== Theoretical framework and services ==
School social work is structured around a range of practice models.

=== Traditional-clinical model ===
John Alderson was the first to describe the existed traditional-clinical models. Generally the schools followed social change model whose major focus was the dysfunctional conditions of the school; the community school model which urged school social workers to employ community organization methods; and the social interaction model which de-emphasized a specific methodology and required the worker to intervene with the systems interacting with the target system. These were known as the Traditional models. Students who have disabilities are defined as exceptional children by federal and state legislation, including the Individuals with Disability Education Act (P.L. 94-142), the Rehabilitation Act (Section 504) in the United States of America.

In the clinical model, school social workers work primarily through casework methods supplemented by group methods with students and family members; A greater emphasis is placed on evidence-based practice and promising intervention methods that is supported empirically.

=== Home-school-community relations model ===
Later school social workers used an approach that draws on components of the existing multidisciplinary models - Social interaction model, focusing on working with students with social and emotional difficulties and their problems in families(parents) and schools with a flexible and dynamic reciprocal interaction. This model is grounded on systems theory and transactional systems perspective. This model was an answer to organize the methodological diversity inherent in the role, rather than limiting to individual change or systems change.

=== School-community-pupil relations model ===
Leading social worker Lela B. Costin, in 1973 developed this model which focuses on the school, community, and student and the interactions among the three. In this model, school social workers serve as mediators, negotiators, consultants, and advocates for students and school personnel, listening to student grievances. They also set up informal groups for students, teachers, and other school personnel. This model also focuses on evaluation by a school social worker of the characteristics of students, the school, and community conditions and their relational effect on the availability and quality of educational opportunities to specific target groups (students with chemical dependency, disabilities, and so on). They are grounded in social learning theory and systems theory.

=== Clinical and environmental interaction model ===
This model is grounded on the ecological systems theory. This was developed by Frey and Dupper (2005) and Germain (2006). The model promotes view of person and environment as a unitary interacting system in which each constantly affects and shapes the other. This model attends the complexities of the person as well as the environment by engaging progressive forces in people and situational assets, and impinging the removal of environmental obstacles for growth and adaptive functioning. This model leads to an effecting dynamic change.

The role of school social workers continues to expand as the knowledge-base and the level of student need grows or the recognition of opportunities to address student need. Two examples of this role expansion include functional behavior assessment, an efficient, empirically - supported, and amenable approach to undesirable school behavior that can be accomplished in a classroom collaboration model with teachers (Waller, 2008) and a leadership role in helping schools become foundational in promoting the mental health of children and adolescents in a manner similar to the role that schools already play in promoting physical health. Indeed, the roles played by School Social Workers has grown so substantially as a direct result of student needs, consultation, education, and collaboration with other school personnel (e.g. Waller, 2008) is a practice which is only destined to grow as a means of insufficient resources being used to their greatest advantage.

== Functions ==
A survey published in 1989 by school social work experts categorized five job function dimensions.

- Relationships with and services to children and families.
- Relationships with and services to teachers and school staff.
- Administrative and professional tasks.
- Services to other school personnel.
- Community services.

Further research on these roles revealed other important areas that are frequently addressed - Consultation and teamwork; needs assessment and program evaluation; Social work interventions with systems; developmental programs management. A role where school social work falls short is in the range of administering diagnostic psychological tests.

== Education and training in the USA ==
American States regulate school social work practice in different ways. Approximately 33 jurisdictions license or certify school social workers. Most require a master's degree in social work (MSW), but a smaller number of states also license Bachelors of Social Work (holders of the BSW degree). The National Association of Social Workers with 150,000 members also offers a Certified School Social Work Specialist (C-SSWS) Certificate in school social work revised from the 1992 School Social Work Credential Exam. It does not replace any license or certification that individual states require of school social workers.

The Council on Social Work Education (CSWE) is the American accrediting body for social work education at the BSW and MSW levels. It specifies foundational social work program components, but social work specialties areas are defined by the individual accredited MSW programs. "Social work education is grounded in the liberal arts and contains a coherent, integrated professional foundation in social work practice from which an advanced practice curriculum is built at the graduate level.

== Associations & professional journals ==
School social workers work to promote student learning and well-being, address academic and non-academic barriers to learning, develop comprehensive and cohesive academic and social supports, and understand and apply diverse frameworks for evidence-based practice and program development for the educational process to work the fullest extent.

Major associations in North America include the School Social Work Association of America, the American Council for School Social Work, and the Canadian Association of School Social Workers and Attendance Counsellors.

School social work journals have been published across the globe including the School Social Work Journal sponsored by the Illinois Association of School Social Workers, the Journal of School Social Work (JSSW) from Chennai, India and the Canadian Journal of School Psychology from SAGE Publications, Canada.

== See also ==
- Career counseling
- Child and Youth Worker
- School counselor
- School psychology
- School social work in Hungary
- Teacher
Mental Health Promotion in Schools
