= Douglas Cockerell =

British bookbinder (1870–1945)

Douglas Bennett Cockerell
- Born: 5 August 1870; London, England, British Empire
- Died: 25 November 1945 (aged 75); Letchworth, England, United Kingdom
- Occupations: bookbinder, scholar
- Spouses: Florence Arundel (m. 1898; died 1912) Bessie Gilford (m. 1914)
- Children: Catherine Cobb, Sydney Morris Cockerell, and 1 other daughter
- Relatives: Sydney Carlyle Cockerell (brother), Theodore Dru Alison Cockerell (brother), Olive Juliet Cockerell (sister), Florence Kate Kingsford (sister-in law), Christopher Cockerell (nephew)

Douglas Bennett Cockerell (5 August 1870 – 25 November 1945) was a British bookbinder and author.

== Early life and education ==
Douglas Bennett Cockerell was born on 5 August 1870 in Clifton Cottage, Sydenham in London, England to parents Alice Elizabeth (née Bennett) and Sydney John Cockerell. They were a middle class family but when his father died in 1877, the family struggled. He attended the St. Paul’s School, until age 15 when he moved to Canada. Cockerell wasn't doing well in school and Canada gave him new opportunities, initially he worked on a farm. At the age of 20, he ended up managing a bank at Portage la Prairie, Manitoba.

Cockerell returned to England in 1891 and worked as a secretary of the Chiswick School of Arts and Crafts in west London. His brother Sydney Cockerell was a secretary to William Morris of the Kelmscott Press, which gave him an introduction to book arts. Cockerell apprenticed under T.J. Cobden-Sanderson from 1893 until 1897 at the Doves Bindery in Hammersmith, London, where he learned to bind new books and make book repairs.

== Career ==
After he completed his apprenticeship, in 1897 he opened his own bindery at 6 Denmark Street, off Charing Cross Road in London and started teaching at the London County Council Central School of Arts and Crafts (now known as Central School of Art and Design). When he was not able to find teaching resources, Cockerell wrote his own instructional book, Bookbinding and the Care of Books (1901). He taught at Central School of Art and Design from 1897 until 1905, and then again until 1935 from 1921. He also taught at the Royal College of Art. Douglas’s most celebrated pupil/employee and partner was Roger Powell who founded his own bindery in Froxfield Hampshire. Powell rebound The Book of Kells in Dublin in 1953. Students of Cockerell included his son Sydney Morris Cockerell, Polly Lada-Mocarski, Elizabeth Greenhill, and others. The founders of the Sangorski & Sutcliffe bookbinder firm met in a Cockerell course at Central School of Art and Design.

Cockerell continued to teach, experiment with binding and materials, document his knowledge in authored books, and take new bindery jobs for art books.

In 1936, he received “Designer for Industry of the Royal Society of Arts”.

== Personal life ==
Cockerell had five siblings including museum curator Sydney Cockerell, entomologist Theodore Dru Alison Cockerell, and illustrator Olive Juliet Cockerell.

On 5 August 1898, Cockerell married Florence Arundel, a craft jeweller who also worked in the bindery at 6 Denmark Street. They had three children, Catherine in 1903, Sydney Morris, known as Sandy, and Oliver in 1908. Florence Cockerell died of tuberculosis in 1912. The children were placed under the guardianship of Dr. Bessie Marion Gilford (c.1872–1956), a local doctor who qualified in 1904. Cockerell married her on 14 January 1914.

Douglas Cockerell died at his home, 298 Norton Way South, Letchworth, on 25 November 1945.

Sydney "Sandy" Morris Cockerell, his son, carried on the work at the bindery after his death, as did Roger Powell, who had worked there from 1935 to 1947. The bindery closed down in 1987, after Sandy's death.

== Ancestry ==
Ancestors of Douglas Cockerell

Sydney Cockerell
Douglas Cockerell
John Bennett
John Bennett
Alice Bennett
Agnes Willson

== Collections ==
University College London Special Collections holds letters from Cockerell to Sir Herbert Thompson which discuss the bindings of medieval manuscripts.

== Publications ==
- Cockerell, Douglas (2019) [1st pub. 1901]. Bookbinding and the Care Of Books. London, England: John Hogg. ISBN 9780243847938.
- Cockerell, Douglas (1902). The Artistic Craft (1 ed.). New York City, New York: Appleton.
- Cockerell, Douglas (2015) [1st pub. 1904]. A Note on Bookbinding. London, England: W H Smith & Son. ISBN 9781528712590.
