= Cockerill (disambiguation) =

Cockerill is an English surname.

Cockerill may also refer to:

- Cockerill-Sambre, group of Belgian steel manufacturers headquartered in Seraing
- Cockerill i-X, armoured fighting vehicle manufactured by the Belgian company John Cockerill
- A number of related Belgian steel companies: (chronologically):
  - John Cockerill (company, 1825–1955), Cockerill-Ougrée (1955), Cockerill-Ougrée-Providence (1966), Cockerill-Ougrée-Providence et Espérance Longdoz (1970), Cockerill (1979) or Cockerill-Sambre (1981).
  - also Cockerill Maintenance & Ingénierie, Belgian mechanical engineering company

== See also ==
- John Cockerill
