= Margaret Frere =

British school manager and welfare worker

- Born: 12 August 1863; Bloomsbury
- Died: 14 March 1961 (aged 97); Sawbridgeworth
- Known for: established the model for a school care service

Margaret Frere (12 August 1863 – 14 March 1961) was a British school manager and welfare worker. She established the model for a school care service that was adopted throughout London's elementary schools.

== Life ==
Frere was born in Bloomsburyin London's west end. Her parents were Adelaide Ellen (born Rowe) and Bartle John Laurie Frere who was a solicitor. She was a manager of a poor school in Seven Dials, London. At the time poor schoolchildren were given meal tickets and other material help, but they remained underfed and badly clothed. She and another manager of her school visited the homes of the children who were receiving help. She realised that unless the parents were visited, and assisted too, then there was no permanent improvement.

In January 1899 the managers and teachers of Miss Frere's school set up the Charitable Funds Committee for the children's welfare; they visited families to help with boots and clothing, physical defects, holidays, and employment on leaving school. The committee was renamed Children's Relief Committee, then Children's Care Committee. Her school was recognised as one of the best for welfare amongst similar poor schools.

Responsibility for London's schools was transferred from the school board for London to the London County Council (LCC) in 1904, and all relief committees were merged. In 1907 this became the school care service, charged with ensuring that poor pupils were sufficiently fed and clothed to benefit from their schooling, modelled on Miss Frere's Children's Care Committee, in line with her philosophy that a care service should "unite the home with the school education". The new school care service relied on volunteers, but they were initially organised by two women employed by London County Council; Helen Nussey was one of them. Theodora Morton was their boss and head of the new service. Morton divided the service into twelve regions where care committees staffed by volunteers identified children in need of school dinners or other assistance.

In 1909 Frere published a small handbook "Children's Care Committees: How to Work Them in Public Elementary Schools" which she aimed at women school managers to help them with their "social and charitable work as distinct from their official work."

By the time war broke out in 1939 there were 158 employed staff and 5,000 volunteers servicing every elementary school in London, and every school had a "care committee" like the "Charitable Funds Committee" Frere had created forty years before.

Frere was proud of the school care service that grew from "an acorn" she had planted. She was not able to attend the celebrations and the jubilee service in 1958 but she sent a letter. She died in Sawbridgeworth in 1961.
