= Olive Juliet Cockerell =

English artist, illustrator and market gardener (1868-1910)

Olive Juliet Cockerell (1868-1910) was an English artist and illustrator trained in the Arts and Crafts school. She and her partner later became early pioneers of "French gardening" in the UK.

== Family ==
Cockerell was born in Dulwich, London on 13 September 1868, the daughter of Sydney John Cockerell (1842–1877) and Alice Elizabeth (née Bennett). Her brothers were Sydney Carlyle Cockerell who became director of the Fitzwilliam Museum, Theodore Dru Alison Cockerell, the entomologist who settled in the United States, and the bookbinder Douglas Bennett Cockerell. Their maternal grandfather, John Bennett, was described by members of the Cockerell family as 'abominable' and 'something of a monster'.

== Arts and crafts ==
Cockerell studied at Chiswick School of Art in the late 1880s. She became an artist and illustrator and her drawings earned the admiration of John Ruskin. Ruskin kept her letters and she visited him at Brantwood, his lake district home, early in 1888. She illustrated children's books authored by A. M. W. Stirling and by Mary De Morgan (a close family friend of William Morris)

Cockerell's brother, Sydney, had worked with William Morris from 1892 as his private secretary, was secretary to Morris' Kelmscott Press and, after Morris died in 1896, he was an executor. This led to Olive visiting Kelmscott in 1901, the home of William Morris and where his wife Jane Morris still spent much of her time. A close and enduring friendship developed between the two women who shared various traits and interests including that for gardening, Jane Morris wrote that Olive had "promised to come for a long stay in Spring" (of 1902).

== Market gardening ==
Cockerell's godmother was Octavia Hill who had been a friend of her father and Olive became involved in "slum philanthropy" in the poorer parts of London. Whilst helping Hill with her work she met Helen Nussey who was carrying out social work in the area. Cockerell and Nussey became friends and decided to undertake the development a French market garden, growing and selling fresh local fruit and vegetables.

In November 1906 Octavia Hill wrote to Olive, concerned about her intention of moving to the country to train as a market gardener in what seemed to be a “complete reversal of occupation”. Cockerell and Nussey started searching for a site to locate the market garden in the autumn of 1907. Their search started in Hampshire but they eventually chose a site "on the estate of a friend in Sussex", with Chanctonbury Ring visible in the distance. The garden, c. 2 acres, near Southwater, Horsham, was opened in 1908.

In the early part of the 20th century French gardening was capturing the interest of the UK public (the King, Edward VII, twice visited a French garden) and in 1909 Nussey and Cockerell published the book "A French garden in England: a record of the successes and failures of a first year of intensive culture", which Cockerell also illustrated.

== Death ==
Cockerell suffered a decline in her health and she died of cancer on 24 July 1910 at St. Thomas’s Home (part of St Thomas' Hospital, London).

Her death led to the closure of the market garden which folded in September 1910. Her ashes were scattered onto Coniston Water from Ruskin's boat.
