= Mstislav Gospel =

12th-century manuscript

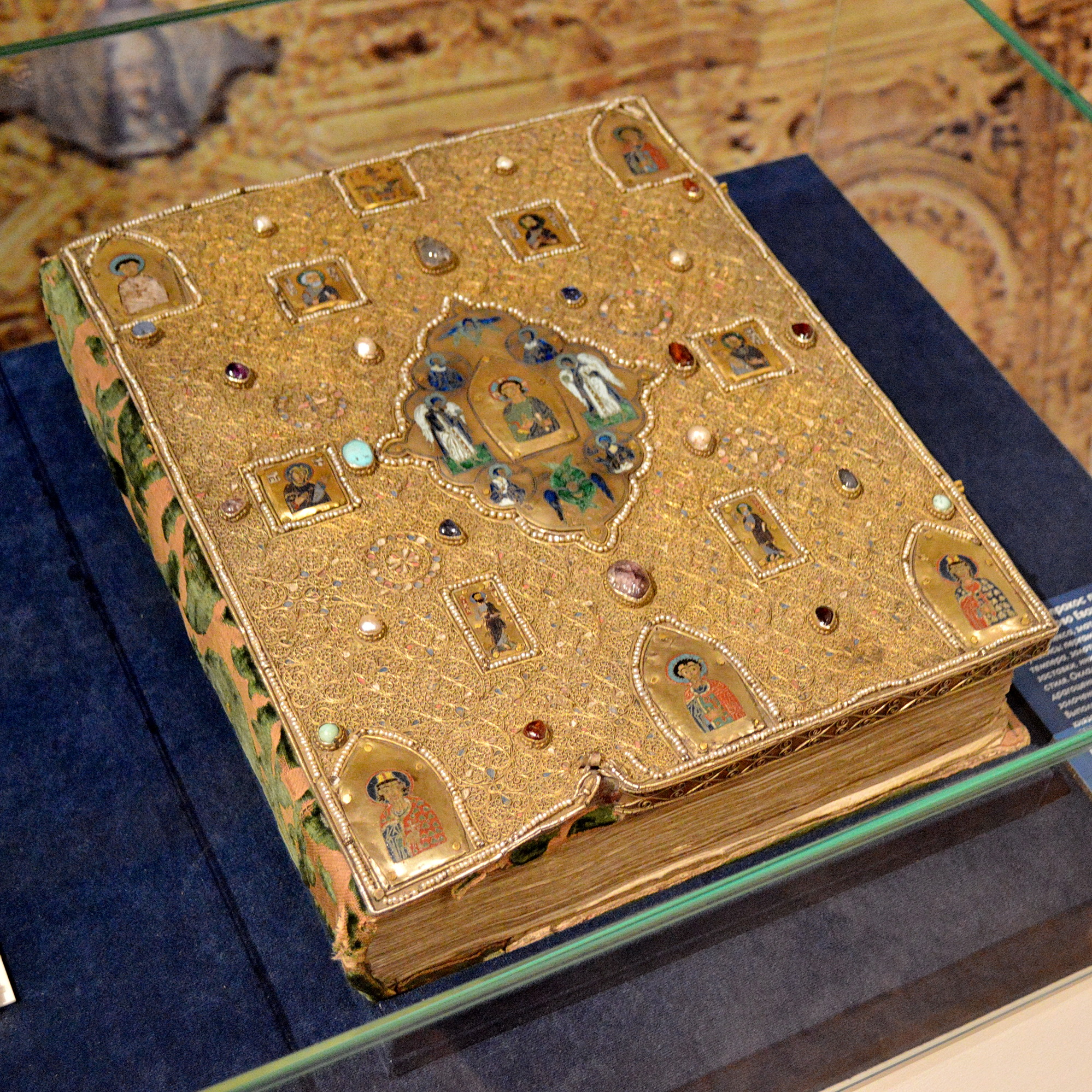

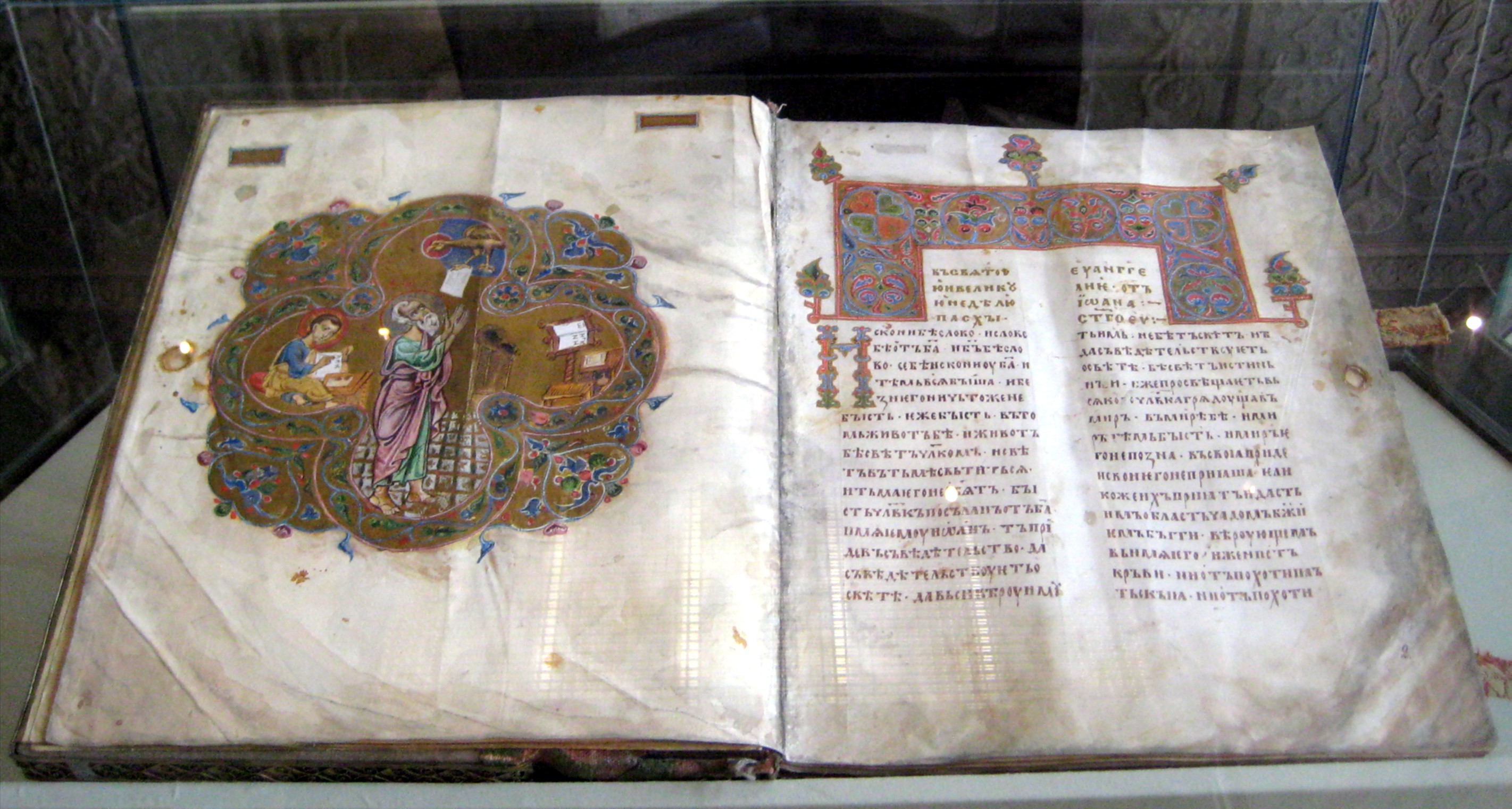

Mstislav Gospel is a 12th-century manuscript of the four Gospels on parchment in Old Church Slavonic. It is kept in the State Historical Museum in Moscow. The manuscript contains the text of the four Gospels on 213 parchment leaves (35.3 by 28.6 cm). Its miniatures, headpieces, and illuminated initials are in several colors and contain copious amounts of gold.

The book was commissioned by Mstislav the Great and written by scribe Alexa for one of the churches in Novgorod. In 1551, Ivan the Terrible commissioned a treasure binding which incorporates 13 Byzantine miniatures from the 10th century, 5 miniatures from the 11th century and 6 Russian miniatures from the 12th century.

After the Massacre of Novgorod, like other ancient treasures of Novgorod, the book was brought to the Moscow Kremlin, where it was placed in the Cathedral of the Archangel.
