= Theodora Morton =

English welfare worker (1872–1949)

- Born: 23 August 1872; South Norwood, England
- Died: 14 March 1949 (aged 76); Westminster, England
- Occupation: School social worker
- Employer: London County Council
- Known for: leading London's new school care service
- Successor: Helen Nussey

Theodora Matilda Morton MBE (23 August 1872 – 14 March 1949) was an English welfare worker. She led the new school care service when it was established based on the ideas of Margaret Frere.

== Life ==
Morton was born in South Norwood in 1872. Her parents were Matilda (born Fuessly) and Joseph Morton. Her father made cutlery. She gained her experience dealing with managing the distribution of charitable assistance working for the Charity Organization Society (COS). The COS would visit families requiring assistance and arrange what was necessary.

At the beginning of 1908 she and Douglas Pepler who had both worked for the COS as temporary employees of the London County Council. They were the first principal organisers of the school care service and within a year their positions were made permanent. Pepler left leaving Morton with this challenging position.

The approach was based on the pioneering work of school manager Margaret Frere and her Charitable Funds Committee. Frere believed that a care service should "unite the home with the school education". The new school care service relied on volunteers but they were initially organised by two women employed by London County Council. Morton was their boss and responsible for the new service. Morton divided the service into twelve regions where care committees staffed by volunteers identified children in need of school dinners or other assistance.

By 1925 she was earning more than four times the salary of the best paid women teachers. She was organising 900 care committees and about 6,000 volunteers. There were over 1,000 elementary schools in London and nearly every one had a dedicated committee.

In 1930 Morton was awarded an MBE and she retired. Helen Nussey who had worked for Morton was appointed as her replacement as "Principal Organiser".

Morton died in Westminster.
