= William Cox Bennett =

English poet (1820–1895)

- Born: 14 October 1820; Greenwich
- Died: 4 March 1895; Blackheath
- Occupation: Writer

William Cox Bennett (1820 – 1895) was an English poet. He published numerous works, often including a self-written preface. One of his better-known poems is that of "Baby May".

== Life ==
He was born at Greenwich on 14 October 1820, was the younger son of John Bennett, a watchmaker of that place. His older brother was John Bennett (watchmaker), later Sir John. He was educated at Greenwich in the school of William Collier Smithers, but when he was nine he was compelled, by the death of his father, to remain at home to assist his mother in business.

Bennett took much interest in the affairs of his native borough, and succeeded in effecting several useful reforms.

In 1845, he married Emma Sophia Willson, sister of his brother John's wife Agnes Willson. The couple had several children.

In 1868, he proposed William Ewart Gladstone to the Liberals of the borough as their candidate, and assisted to secure his return by very strenuous exertions.

He was a member of the London council of the National Education League.

In 1869 and 1870, he was employed on the staff of the Weekly Dispatch as a leader writer and art critic, and subsequently he contributed to the London Figaro.

He died on 4 March 1895 at his residence at Eliot Cottages, Blackheath, and was buried at Nunhead cemetery on 8 March.

== Works ==
Bennett was well known as a writer of songs. His chief works are:

- Poems, London, 1850, 8vo; new edit. 1862.
- War Songs, London, 1855, 8vo.
- Queen Eleanor's Vengeance and other Poems, London, 1867, 8vo.
- Songs for Sailors, London, 1872, 8vo; 2nd edit. 1873.
- Baby May: Home Poems and Ballads, London, 1875, 8vo.
- Songs of a Song Writer, London, 1876, 8vo.
- Prometheus the Fire-Giver: an attempted Restoration of the lost First Port of the Promethean Trilogy of Æschylus, London, 1877, 8vo.
- The Lark : Songs, Ballads, and Recitations for the People, London, 1885, 4to.

His 'Songs for Sailors' were set to music in 1878 by John Liptrot Hatton. A collective edition of his poems appeared in 1862 in Routledge's British Poets.

== Bibliography ==
William Cox Bennett published titles including:

- "Baby May"
- "The Sick Man's Prayer" (1850)
- "Queen Eleanor's Vengeance and Other Poems" (1857)
- "Songs by a Song-Writer" (1859)
- Poems (1862)
- "Proposals For and Contributions To a Ballad History of England" (1868)
- "Our Glory Roll and Other National Poems" (1866)
- "Baby May: Home Poems and Ballads" (1875)
