= Samuel Cockerill =

English cricketer

Personal information
- Full name: Samuel Pepys Cockerill
- Born: June 18, 1794; St James, London, England
- Died: February 7, 1869 (aged 74); Mayfair, Westminster, Middlesex, England

Domestic team information
- Years: Team
- 1817: Old Wykehamists
- 1819: Gentlemen
- 1819: Marylebone Cricket Club

Samuel Pepys Cockerill (18 June 1794 – 7 February 1869) was an English amateur cricketer who played from 1817 to 1819.

Cockerill attended Winchester College and subsequently played for the Old Wykehamists in a match in 1817, one of his 2 known appearances in important matches. He played for the Gentlemen in the 1819 Gentlemen v Players match.

== Bibliography ==
- Haygarth, Arthur (1996) [1862]. Scores & Biographies, Volume 1 (1744–1826). Kennington: Frederick Lillywhite. ISBN 978-19-00592-23-9.
