= Sydney Cockerell =

English curator, collector and museum director (1867–1962)

Sir Sydney Cockerell
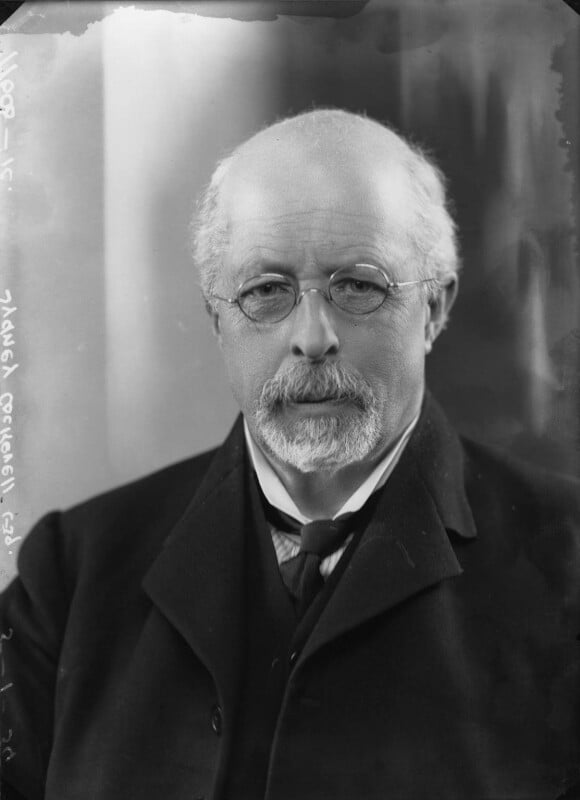
- Cockerell in 1934
- Born: 18 July 1867
- Died: 1 May 1962 (aged 94)
- Spouse: Florence Kingsford
- Children: Christopher; Margaret; Katharine

Sir Sydney Carlyle Cockerell (16 July 1867 – 1 May 1962) was an English museum curator and collector. From 1908 to 1937, he was director of the Fitzwilliam Museum in Cambridge, England. He was knighted in 1934.

== Biography ==
Sydney Cockerell made his way initially as a clerk in the family coal business, George J. Cockerell & Co., until he met John Ruskin. Around 1887, Cockerell sent Ruskin some sea shells, which he collected.

At that time he had already met William Morris. Cockerell tried to patch up a quarrel between Ruskin and Octavia Hill, who had been a friend of his late father Sydney John Cockerell, and godmother to his sister, Olive.

From 1891, Cockerell gained a more solid entry to intellectual circles, working for the Society for the Protection of Ancient Buildings. The architect Detmar Blow was a friend. He acted as private secretary to William Morris, becoming a major collector of Kelmscott Press books; was secretary also to Wilfrid Scawen Blunt; and was Thomas Hardy's executor.

From 1908 to 1937, Cockerell was Director of the Fitzwilliam Museum, in Cambridge. He built up the museum's collections of private-press books and manuscripts, prints, drawings, paintings (including Titian's Tarquin and Lucretia), ceramics and antiquities. It was he who secured the museum's rich holdings of works by William Blake and who bought its first Picasso print. He raised funds for building extensions, set up the first 'Friends' scheme in Britain and introduced Sunday opening.

Cockerell appears as one of a circle of three figures in the book by Dame Felicitas Corrigan, The Nun, the Infidel, and the Superman, with Dame Laurentia McLachlan and George Bernard Shaw. It was later dramatised by Hugh Whitemore as The Best of Friends, which was produced on stage at the Hampstead Theatre in 2006 and on television in 1991.

According to Penelope Fitzgerald's biography of Charlotte Mew, Charlotte Mew and Her Friends (1984), "Cockerell was one of the six children of a Brighton coal merchant who died quite young. This meant a hard start, but, as he told his biographer, Wilfred Blunt, 'I was protected by poverty from marriage until I was forty.' During that time he was able to develop his two ruling passions - the arts (or rather the classification and collecting of them), and the cultivating of great men. When he became Director of the Fitzwilliam in 1908 he identified the museum entirely with himself, and heroic indeed were his efforts to tap bequests, endowments, and death-bed legacies which would enrich it in every department. He calculated that during his lifetime he had made a quarter of a million pounds for the Fitzwilliam, and about a dozen enemies."

The 2003–2004 Sandars Readership in Bibliography held by Christopher de Hamel examined the life of Cockerell and his work with illuminated manuscripts, his career at the Museum, and as a private collector.

Cockerell was a member of the Red Rose Guild.

== Family ==
He was the son of Sydney John Cockerell (1842–1877) and Alice Elizabeth Bennett, daughter of John Bennett. The bee expert Theodore Dru Alison Cockerell, who settled in the United States, was his brother, as was the bookbinder Douglas Bennett Cockerell. He was a year older than his sister Olive Juliet. The bookbinder Sandy Cockerell (Sydney Morris Cockerell) was his nephew.

He was married to the illuminator and designer Florence Kate Kingsford, who in 1916 was diagnosed with multiple sclerosis. They had two daughters, Margaret and Katharine, and a son, Christopher Cockerell, who invented the hovercraft.

== Ancestry ==
Ancestors of Sydney Cockerell

Sydney Cockerell
Sydney Cockerell
John Bennett
John Bennett
Alice Bennett
Agnes Willson

== Sources ==
- Online Archive of California
