= Helen Nussey =

British welfare worker and writer

- Born: 27 November 1875; Richmond, London, England
- Died: 6 February 1965 (aged 89); Beckenham Hospital, England
- Other names: Helen G. Nussey
- Education: Cheltenham Ladies' College
- Occupation: organiser of volunteers
- Employer: London County Council
- Known for: first almoner, early social worker to poor London schools

Helen Georgiana Nussey OBE (27 November 1875 – 6 February 1965) was an early British welfare worker and writer on gardening.

== Life ==
Nussey was born in Richmond, London in 1875. Her parents were Mary Anne (born Charrington) and Antony Foxcroft Nussey who was a solicitor. She was educated at the Cheltenham Ladies' College boarding school and went on to work for Westminster Hospital where she was their first almoner looking after the needs of patients. She worked there for seven years.

In 1909 she and Olive J. Cockerell published, "A French garden in England: a record of the successes and failures of a first year of intensive culture".

Before war broke out London decided to create a school care service that would be modelled on the pioneering work of school manager Margaret Frere and her Charitable Funds Committee who had realised in 1898 that handing out missing goods like shoes did not benefit poor children unless the parents were visited and assisted too. Frere believed that a care service should "unite the home with the school education". The new school care service relied on volunteers but they were initially organised by two women employed by London County Council and Nussey was one of them. Theodora Morton was their boss and responsible for the new service. Morton divided the service into twelve regions where care committees staffed by volunteers identified children in need of school dinners or other assistance.

In 1930 Theodora Morton retired and Nussey was appointed as her replacement as "Principal Organiser". She valued the work and her departments Independence. Gladly children were now shod, but children and families still needed support. In 1939 when war broke out there was 158 employed staff and 5,000 volunteers servicing every elementary school in London. And every school had a care committee.

In 1940 she was recognised for her work with an OBE and although she retired she continued to volunteer. Other activities included gardening and writing. She had published "London Gardens of the Past " the year before when she had been made an honorary organiser of the London Gardens Society. She continued her interest and in 1950 the London Garden Society published her short guide to "Miniature Alpine Gardens".

Nussey died in 1965 in Beckenham Hospital.
