= John Cockerill =

John Cockerill may refer to:

- John Cockerill (industrialist) (1790–1840), English-born entrepreneur who became prominent in Belgium
  - John Cockerill & Cie., founded by John Cockerill, later known as Société anonyme John Cockerill
  - John Cockerill (company), formerly Cockerill Maintenance & Ingénierie (CMI), which split off from Cockerill-Sambre
- John Cockerill (footballer) (born 1961), English former professional football player and manager
