= Joseph Zaehnsdorf =

Joseph Zaehnsdorf (27 February 1816 – 7 November 1886), was a bookbinder.

Zaehnsdorf was the son of Gottlieb Zaehnsdorf, of Pesth in Austria-Hungary, where he was born and educated. At the age of fifteen he was apprenticed to Herr Knipe, a bookbinder of Stuttgart, with whom he remained five years, afterwards proceeding to Vienna, where he worked in the shop of Herr Stephan, a bookbinder in a large way of business. He left Vienna about 1836, and successively visited Zürich, Freiburg, Baden-Baden, and Paris.

In 1837 he came to London, and obtained employment in the establishment of Messrs Wesley & Co., Friar Street, Doctors' Commons, for whom he worked three years. He afterwards entered the shop of Mr Mackenzie, a binder of considerable eminence, and there he remained until 1844, when he commenced business on his own account at 2 Wilson Street, removing in 1856 to 30 Brydges Street, Covent Garden, afterwards called 36 Catherine Street. Zaehnsdorf became a naturalised British subject in 1855, and died at 14 York Street, Covent Garden, on 7 December 1886.

He exhibited at the London International Exhibition of 1862, where he received honourable mention. He also obtained medals at the Anglo-French Working Class Exhibition, held at the Crystal Palace in 1865, at the Dublin International Exhibition of 1865, at the Exposition Universelle (1867), at Vienna in 1873, and at Victoria and Albert Museum in 1874. "Zaehnsdorf bindings" are sought for and readily identified by the amateur of fine bindings.

Zaehnsdorf was acquainted with the German, French, and Italian languages, and also with several of the Slavonic tongues. In July 1849 he married Ann, daughter of John Mahoney, by whom he had an only child, Joseph William Zaehnsdorf, his successor in business and author of The Art of Bookbinding: a practical treatise (2nd ed. 1890).
