= William Simmonds (craftsman) =

William George Simmonds (1876–1968) was a 20th-century draftsman, artist, craftsman, and — together with his wife Eve Simmonds, a musician and embroiderer — proprietor of a touring puppet theatre, who lived in Gloucestershire and who was part of the Arts and Crafts movement.

== Life ==
Born in 1876, Simmonds studied at the Royal College of Art and went on to exhibit at the Royal Academy from 1903 onwards. His wife Eve, born in 1884 in Walthamstow as Eve Peart, studied art at The Slade, and they married in 1912. During World War One, William was a designer, of both tanks and (with Geoffrey de Havilland) aircraft.

After living for a time in Fovant, and then London, they moved to Far Oakridge in 1919, where together they ran a puppet theatre. The interest in puppets originated in Fovant, where William attending the bedside of his sick father began to carve puppets. They were later, in the 1920s and 1930s, to take the theatre on tour, performing at various venues around the country including the Grafton Theatre for three weeks per year.

In Oakridge, Eve became an embroiderer and William participated in a local theatre group, the Oakridge Players. William also pursued his interest in carving, in both wood and ivory, which he had first taken during the war, habitually carrying around a piece of wood or ivory in his pocket to carve. On tour with the puppet theatre, William was, as with the local theatre group, a playwright and set designer, whilst Eve supplied the musical accompaniment on the spinet and was the costumer (both designing and making). William also carved the puppets.

In the year of William's death, 1968, the Cheltenham Art Gallery held an exhibition of his work, which included carvings, sculptures, paintings, drawings, and book designs. At that point, he was the oldest member of the Guild of Gloucestershire Craftsmen. Eve died two years later in 1970.

== Works ==
Works by William Simmonds can be found in various places.

- Shakespeare's Tragedy of Hamlet (Hodder & Stoughton, 1910) with 30 colour illustrations by W.G. Simmonds.
- A 1907 watercolour painting and a 1937 wood-carving are in the Tate Gallery collection.
- A collection of his puppets is in the Gloucester Folk Museum.
- A collection of his carvings and sculptures is in the Gloucester City Museum.
- He carved the rood for the chancel screen in Christ Church, Chalford.

== Sources ==
- "William Simmonds, 1876–1968". Museum of English Rural Life. University of Reading.
- Carruthers, Annette; Greensted, Mary; Roscoe, Barley (2019). Ernest Gimson: Arts & Crafts Designer and Architect. Yale University Press. ISBN 9780300246261.
- "William and Eve Simmonds". The Cheltenham Trust.
