= Florence Kingsford Cockerell =

British noblewoman and illustrator (1871–1949)

Lady Florence Kingsford Cockerell
- Born: 25 May 1871; Canterbury, Kent, England
- Died: 18 September 1949 (aged 78)
- Education: Central School of Arts and Crafts
- Occupations: Illustrator and calligrapher
- Employer: Ashendene Press
- Movement: Arts and Crafts
- Spouse: Sydney Cockerell (m. 1907)
- Children: Christopher Cockerell; Margaret; Katharine

Signature
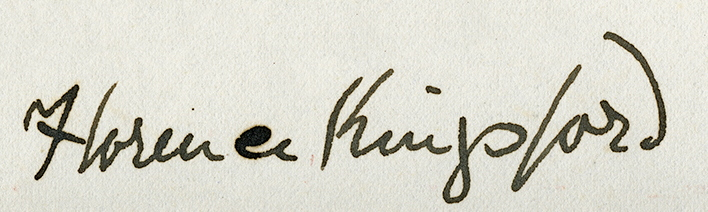

Florence Kate Kingsford, Lady Cockerell (25 May 1871 – 18 September 1949), known variously as Florence Kingsford and Kate Cockerell, was a British illustrator and calligrapher who specialized in creating illuminated manuscripts. She worked with the Ashendene Press, the writer Olive Schreiner, and the archaeologist Flinders Petrie, among others. She is considered a leading illuminator of the British Arts and Crafts movement, with one authority holding that her originality as an illuminator was greater even than that of William Morris. She also designed some sets and costumes for opera and ballet.

== Education and family ==
Florence Kate Kingsford was born in Canterbury, Kent, England, the daughter of Annie Harriette Kingsford (née Mosley) and Charles Tomson Kingsford, a financial agent.

Kingsford studied at the Central School of Arts and Crafts, where she learned techniques of medieval manuscript illumination, such as applying gold leaf to parchment. She further developed her technique by studying with master calligrapher Edward Johnston.

Around 1901, she met museum curator Sydney Cockerell and they married in 1907. They had three children, among them the inventor Christopher Cockerell.

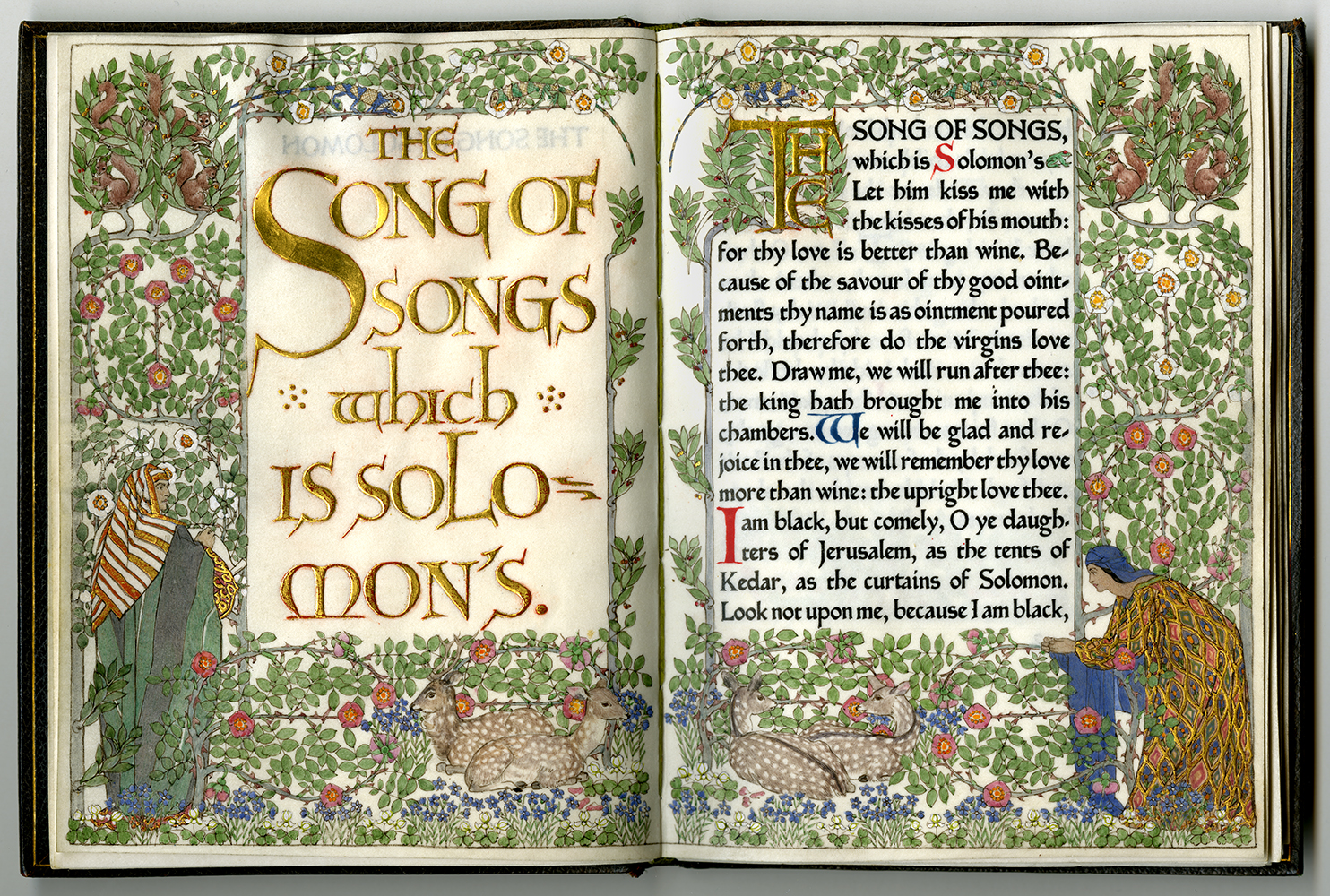
Ashendene Song of Songs, illuminated by Florence Kingsford, 1902

== Illustration work ==
By 1900, Cockerell was exhibiting her work, and in 1901, St John Hornby, the founder of Ashendene Press, hired her to illuminate an Ashendene edition of The Song of Songs Which Is Solomon's printed on vellum. She proceeded to illuminate the 40-odd copies in the edition with variations in the illustrations and decorations for each one.

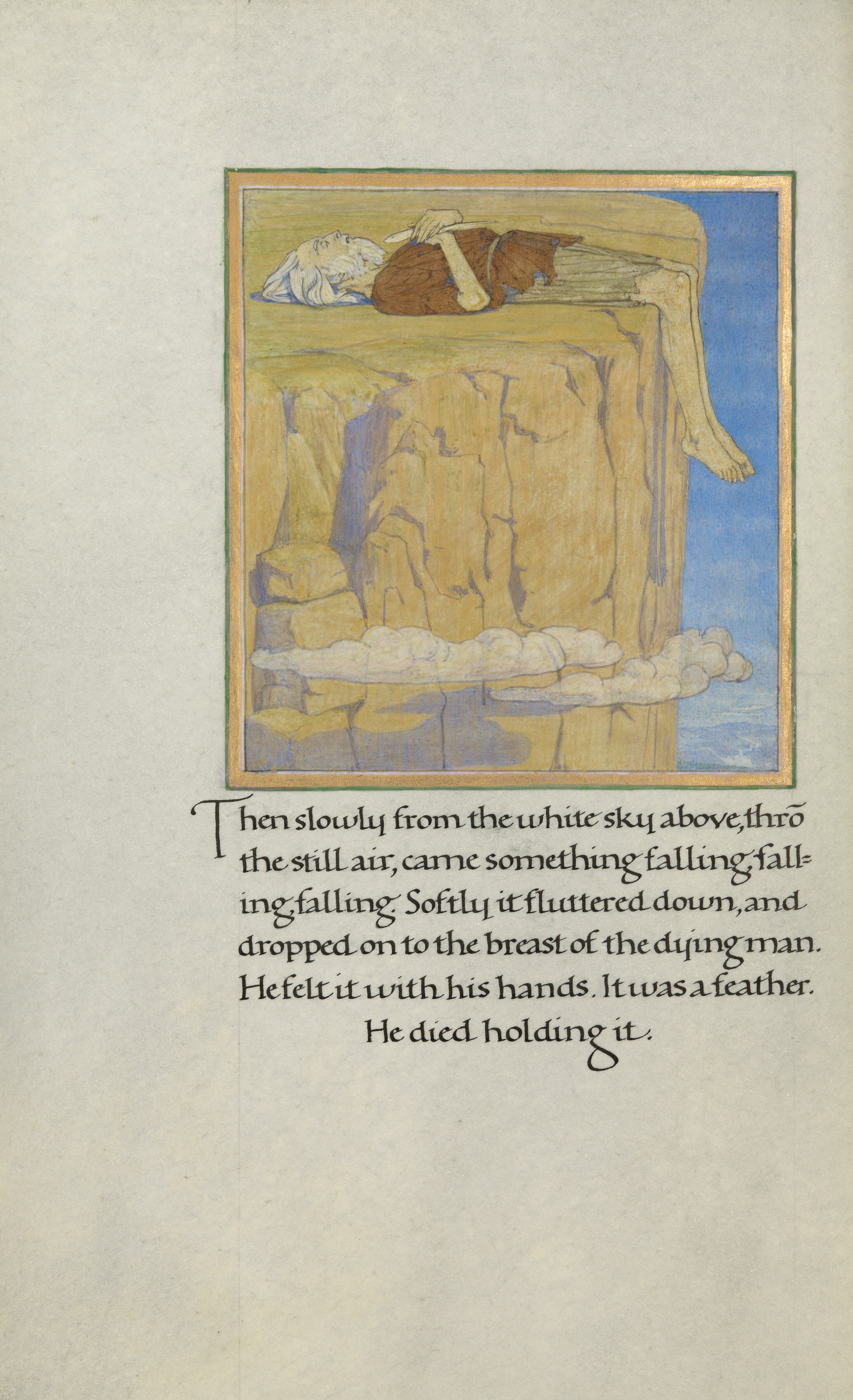
A Dead Hunter, illuminated by Florence Kingsford

Between 1901 and 1904, she contributed decorative initials (often gold) to a number of limited-edition books published by Essex House Press, each featuring a single long poem. These included Thomas Gray's Elegy Written in a Country Churchyard (1901, on vellum), Edmund Spenser's Epithalamion (1901), Robert Burns's Tam O'Shanter (1902, on vellum), John Milton's Comus (1902, on vellum), Samuel Taylor Coleridge's The Ancient Mariner (1904), John Dryden's Alexander's Feast (1904, on vellum), Oliver Goldsmith's The Deserted Village (1904, on vellum).

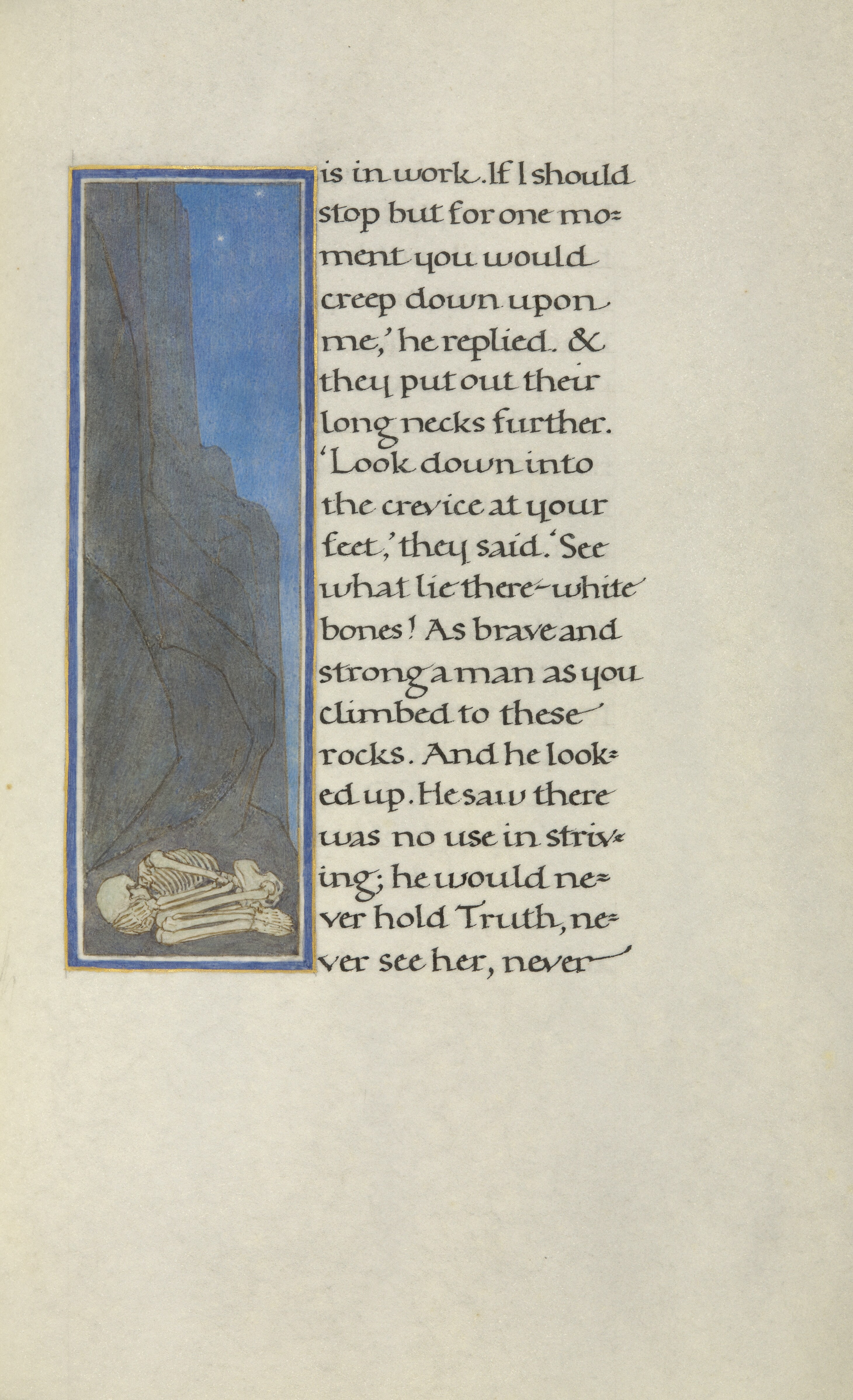
A Human Skeleton at the Foot of a Rock Face, illuminated by Florence Kingsford

In 1906, Cockerell went to Egypt to work for the archaeologist Flinders Petrie, making drawings of his finds. While there, she produced an illuminated version of an ancient Egyptian text attributed to the pharaoh Akhenaten and translated by Francis Llewellyn Griffith. The resulting manuscript, The Illuminated Hymn to Aten the Sun-Disc, features boldly composed paintings of everyday life painted in Cockerell's typically refined style, paired with calligraphic text. It is now in the collection of the Fitzwilliam Museum.

In 1908, Cockerell created an illuminated version of The Story of a Hunter by Olive Schreiner. Again featuring delicate paintings complemented by bold calligraphy, this manuscript is in the collection of the Getty Center, Los Angeles, California, United States.

In 1914, Cockerell's work was exhibited at the Louvre Museum in Paris, France.

In 1916, Cockerell was diagnosed with multiple sclerosis, which effectively ended her career as an illuminator and calligrapher because of the degree to which it affected her hand coordination.

== Theatre designs ==
Cockerell designed sets for a 1913 production of Mozart's opera The Magic Flute conducted by Thomas Beecham. The following year, she was commissioned to design both sets and costumes for a production of Henry Purcell's opera The Fairy-Queen. The preparation phase for this opera dragged on for six years, however, and she eventually handed over the set designs to another artist. She continued working on the costumes, among which were inventive designs for dressing some of the chorus members as monkeys. In 1923, she designed the set for the premiere of Vaughan Williams's ballet Old King Cole.
