= John Bennett (watchmaker) =

John Bennett FRAS
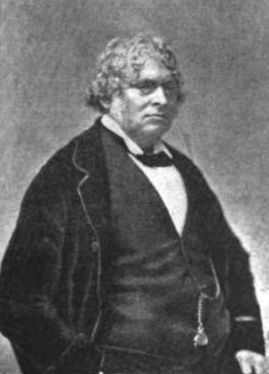

Common Councilman of the City of London
- In office 1862–1889
- Monarch: Queen Victoria
- Constituency: Cheap

Sheriff of London and Middlesex
- In office 1871–1872

Lord Lieutenant of the City of London
- In office 1871–1897

Personal details
- Born: 15 October 1814 Greenwich, England
- Died: 3 July 1897 (aged 82) St Leonard's-on-Sea, England
- Party: Liberal
- Spouse: Agnes Willson (m. 1843)
- Children: 5 sons and 5 daughters
- Education: Colfe's Grammar School
- Profession: Watchmaker

Sir John Bennett (15 October 1814 – 3 July 1897) FRAS was a clockmaker and watchmaker. He was described by one biographer as a "flamboyant personality who seems to have aroused in his contemporaries varying degrees of ridicule, hostility, and admiration".

== Life ==
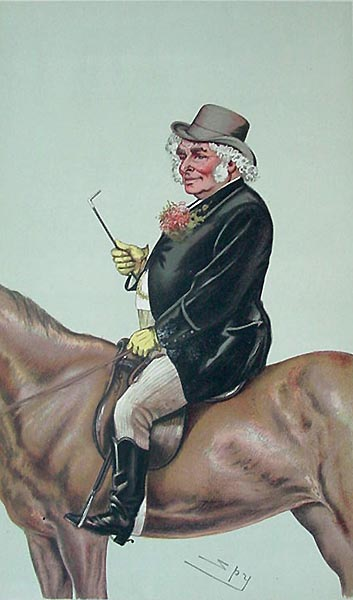
Caricature by "Spy" published in Vanity Fair in 1883

The eldest son of John Bennett, watchmaker, of Greenwich, he was educated at Colfe's Grammar School, Lewisham. In 1846, he established his own business as a watchmaker at 65 Cheapside, in the City of London. His younger brother, the poet William Cox Bennett, was also a watchmaker in Cheapside.

Although trained as a practical watchmaker, Bennett's business at Cheapside was a high street retailer of watches made by English and Swiss watch manufacturers.

Bennett married Agnes Willson in 1843 and the couple had three children, Alice, John, and Juliet. When Bennett retired, he was noted to be boarding with Aimee Guilbert, a widow. She was, in fact, his long term mistress and bore him seven children; Lillie, Lionel, Violet, Rose, Horace, Gerald Munro and Douglas Thurlow, all of whom took their mother's surname.

He retired from business and from the Court of Common Council in 1889, first to Rotherfield, Sussex, and later to St. Leonards-on-Sea on the Sussex coast, where he died in 1897 at the age of 82. He was described in an obituary as "a man of strong character, very eccentric, and one of the most familiar figures in London".

The fate of Bennett's estate is uncertain, with two probate records issued. The first granted probate on 1 February 1898 to Henry Hewitt Bridgman with the estate valued at £463 19s. 6d. A second record of 1899 grants probate to Edward Jones Trustram, solicitor, the attorney of Aimée Guilbert, spinster. By this second probate, the estate had dwindled to just £88 9s. 6d. A notice in the London Gazette of 29 September 1899 asking all creditors of the estate to contact Trustram states that Aimée Guilbert was named executrix in the will.

Bennett was a flamboyant man including in his dress and public appearances. He was reporting as appearing in the Lord Mayor's Show mounted on a white horse whilst dressed in a black velvet jacket and a broad-brimmed hat. The family of his daughter, Alice, described him as "abominable" and "something of a monster".

== Civic career ==
Bennett was a Liveryman of the Spectaclemakers', Clockmakers' and Loriners' companies, and served as Master of the Loriners in 1877–1878.

Bennett was a Common Councilman on the City of London Corporation for the ward of Cheap from 1862 to 1889. In October 1872 he was elected to the London School Board to fill a casual vacancy in the representation of the City of London. Although he stood down from the school board at the election in 1873, he returned to serve a three-year term from 1876 to 1879 and he served a further term 1885–1889.

He was a Sheriff of London and Middlesex in 1871 and following the death of Richard Young again in 1872 and a Lord Lieutenant of the City of London, and was knighted as part of the celebrations for the recovery of the Prince of Wales from typhoid in the same year.

In 1877, he was elected the alderman for Cheap ward, winning by a single vote. It was alleged that eight men who had voted for him had rented property solely to be able to vote and one of those eight admitted as much; the Recorder ruled that this did not invalidate the vote. His opponent then withdrew and Bennett was declared elected. The Court of Aldermen though, declaring him to be "not of fit character" to hold the office, refused to ratify his appointment. Notwithstanding, the Wardmote returned him twice more. On his third return, the Court of Aldermen declared his opponent duly elected, despite his having fewer votes cast in his favour than Bennett. After this third rejection, Bennett withdrew from the election.

He unsuccessfully stood for parliament on three occasions; Greenwich (1873), Maldon (1874) and Wiltshire (1886).

== Honours ==
- Fellow of the Royal Astronomical Society
- Knight Bachelor
- Légion d'honneur
