= Raverats =

Raverats may refer to:

- Jacques Raverat and his wife Gwen Darwin
- Virginia Woolf and the Raverats the correspondence between the above couple and Virginia Woolf
