= Walter Marlborough Pryor =

- Detail from oil on canvas painting of Walter Marlborough Pryor DSO*, 1957, by Maurice Frederick Codner.
- Born: 18 November 1880; Hitchin, Hertfordshire
- Died: 28 May 1962 (aged 81); Hitchin, Hertfordshire
- Military career
- Allegiance: United Kingdom
- Branch: British Army
- Service years: 1914-1918
- Rank: Lieutenant Colonel
- Units: Hertfordshire Regiment, Royal Warwickshire Regiment
- Conflicts: World War I
- Awards: DSO and Bar
- Other work: Deputy Lieutenant of Hertfordshire

Lieutenant Colonel Walter Marlborough Pryor, DSO & Bar, DL, JP (18 November 1880 – 28 May 1962) was a British soldier.

== Early life ==
Pryor was the only son of Marlborough Robert Pryor, DL, JP, Weston Park, Hitchin, Hertfordshire and his wife. He was educated at Eton and Trinity College, Cambridge where he gained a BA (1901), and an MA (1905). In 1910 he married the writer Ethne Philippa, only daughter of Sir Norman Moore, 1st Baronet. They had three sons; John Marlborough Pryor (1911-1984), Mark Gillachrist Marlborough Pryor (1919-1970) and Lieutenant Colonel Robert Matthew Marlborough Pryor MBE (known as Matthew; 1917-2005). His grandson by Matthew is the archaeologist Francis Pryor; by Mark his grandchildren include the author William Pryor and the artist Lucy Raverat.

== First World War ==
During the First World War Pryor served as an officer in the British Army, beginning the war as an acting Captain in the Hertfordshire Regiment. In September 1917 he was promoted to Acting Lieutenant Colonel and placed in command of 1/6th Royal Warwickshire Regiment, leading them on the Western and Italian Fronts for the remainder of the war. During the conflict he was mentioned in despatches four times. In 1917 he was made a companion of the Distinguished Service Order, to which a Bar was added in 1918. Additionally, he was awarded the Italian Bronze Medal of Military Valor in 1919.

== Later life ==
After the war, he was chairman of the Sun Fire Insurance Company and the Sun Life Assurance Society.

He also served as a magistrate and Deputy Lieutenant of Hertfordshire.
