= Edward Exton Barclay =

English gentleman and fox hunter

Photograph of Barclay in hunting regalia, with signature, from Baily's Magazine of Sports & Pastimes, March 1898 edition.

Edward Exton Barclay JP (16 February 1860 – 4 March 1948) was an English gentleman and foxhunter.

== Notes ==
Barclay was the fourth son of (Joseph Gurney Barclay). His brothers included Francis Hubert Barclay, Henry Albert Barclay CVO.

He was educated at Trinity Hall, Cambridge (BA 1882, MA 1885)

He was a partner in Barclays Bank from 1886 to 1896. In Who's Who he listed his career as "Lord of the manor" (of Brent Pelham Hall).

He was master of the Puckeridge Hounds from 1896, from 1910 jointly so with his son Maurice. His Who's Who recreations were listed as "hunting, shooting, fishing".

He married Elizabeth Mary Fowler, daughter of the MP William Fowler, they had two sons (Geoffrey William Barclay MC (4 December 1891 – 28 July 1916 killed in action WW1) and the aforementioned Maurice Edward Barclay CBE (1886-1962) and a daughter. The inscription chosen by the next-of-kin for Geoffrey's headstone in Belgium was: "UNTIL THE DAY BREAK AND THE SHADOWS FLEE AWAY". Edward Barclay's first wife died in 1927. In the same year he remarried Elizabeth Mary Fordham, widow of Harry Fordham, and daughter of the late Marlborough Pryor, of Weston Park. His second wife, the elder sister of his daughter-in-law Margaret, the wife of his son Maurice, died in 1929. Barclay himself died at Brent Pelham Hall on 4 March 1948.
