= Chiddingly =

Village and parish in East Sussex, England

Coordinates: 50.91°N 0.19°E

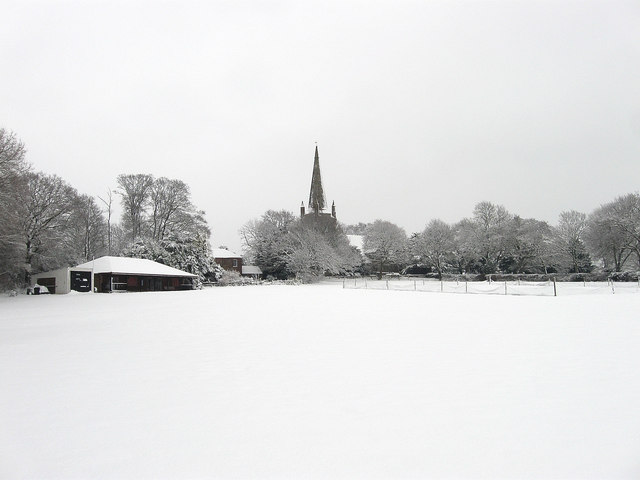
- Chiddingly in the snow

- Location within East Sussex
- Area: 17.6 km^{2} (6.8 sq mi)
- Population: 1,247 (Parish-2011)
  - Density: 148/sq mi (57/km^{2})
- OS grid reference: TQ543142
  - London: 43 miles (69 km) NNW
- District: Wealden
- Shire county: East Sussex
- Region: South East
- Country: England
- Sovereign state: United Kingdom
- Post town: LEWES
- Postcode district: BN8
- Post town: HAILSHAM
- Postcode district: BN27
- Dialling code: 01825
- Police: Sussex
- Fire: East Sussex
- Ambulance: South East Coast
- UK Parliament: Sussex Weald
- Website: http://www.chiddingly.gov.uk/

Chiddingly (/ˈtʃɪdɪŋlaɪ/ CHID-in-lye) is an English village and civil parish in the Wealden District of the administrative county of East Sussex, within historic Sussex, some five miles (8 km) northwest of Hailsham.

The parish is rural in character: it includes the village of Chiddingly and a collection of hamlets: the largest of these being Muddles Green and Thunder's Hill; others being Gun Hill, Whitesmith, Holmes Hill, Golden Cross, Broomham and the westernmost extremity of Upper Dicker. It covers 7 square miles (18 km^{2}) of countryside. Of the more than 340 dwellings in the parish, over fifty have the word "Farm" in their postal address.

== Geography ==
The parish is in the Low Weald. In common with Rome and Sheffield, it is situated over seven hills: Thunders Hill; Gun Hill; Pick Hill; Stone Hill; Scrapers Hill; Burgh Hill, and Holmes Hill, which is on the A22 road in the south of the parish. Tributaries of the River Cuckmere flow both north and south of the village, notably the Bull River which joins the Cuckmere at Horselunges, adjacent to Hellingly. The parish is situated in the Hundred of Shiplake, and within Pevensey Rape.

Link here to a Parish Map delineating the parish boundary over a zoomable Ordnance Survey map, courtesy of the very fine Saturday Walkers' Club

== Governance ==
Chiddingly is part of the electoral ward called Chiddingly and East Hoathly. The population of this ward taken at the 2011 Census was 3,220.

== History ==
The presence of low-grade iron ore in the local sandstone supported Roman mining and smelting in the area.

The final -ly of the name suggests that the village had Saxon origins. The Domesday Book of 1086 refers to Cetelingei with just three households, including a miller and mill.

The 'Chiddingly Boar', found in 1999, was a gilt-silver badge likely to have belonged to a supporter of Richard III during the Wars of the Roses, and probably lost or discarded in the 1480s; it is now in the British Museum and has been adopted as the emblem of the parish Bonfire Society who process through the streets of Sussex each autumn bearing a taxidermy wild boar's head (known as Smutty Sue, and newly resplendent with a full set of tusks) by way of a standard. Many contemporary badges of a similar design were made of pewter, but the Chiddingly example is one of only three known pieces fashioned from precious metals - another having been found on the site of Richard's dénouement at the Battle of Bosworth in 1485, and the third on the foreshore of the River Thames.

There are a large number of manorial buildings in the parish, including Chiddingly Place, rebuilt c. 1574 by Sir John Jefferay, Chief Baron of the Exchequer in 1577; scattered remnants of its E-shaped wings remain, such as the east wing, later called "The Chapel/Chapel Barn" and now known as 'Jefferay House', and sections of the main range west of the demolished Great Hall.

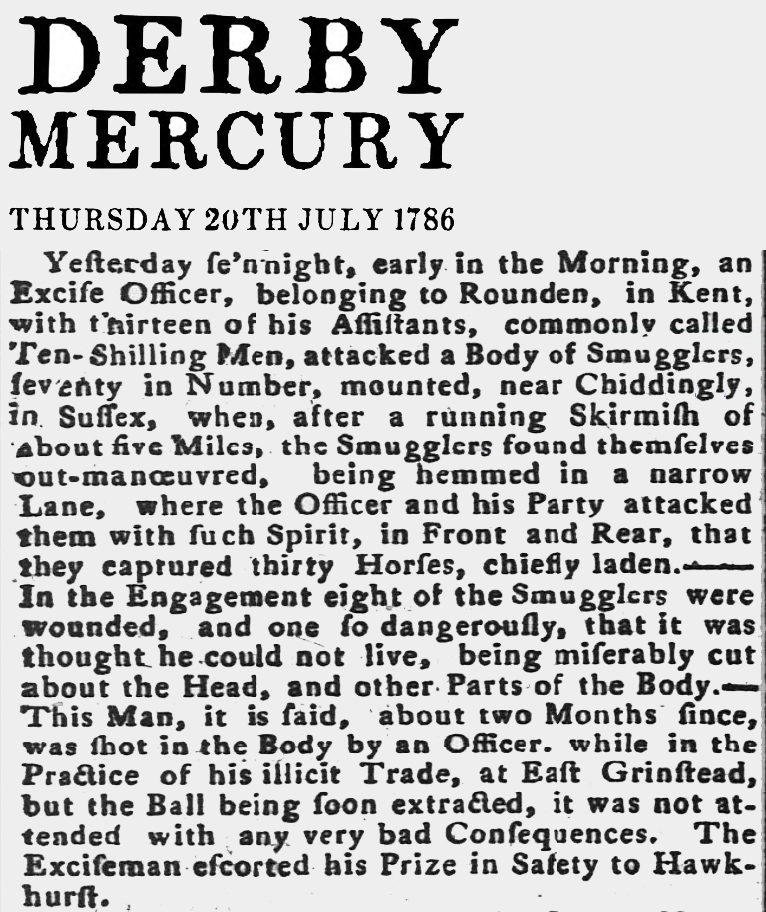
An excerpt from the Derby Mercury recounting the incident which gave rise to the story of the Staggering Smuggler

The village was on the periphery of Sussex's endemic smuggling trade in the 18th century, but even this insubstantial link has left an indelible mark on the area - albeit one of somewhat dubious provenance - by way of 'the Ghost of the Staggering Smuggler'. As reported in the ‘’Derby Mercury’’ of 1786, a violent and wide-ranging confrontation took place between a gang of smugglers and a group of excise officers which culminated in a pitched battle at the eastern end of Stalkers Lane - towards Smithlands Wood and the Bull River - in the July of that same year. This encounter left one of the freebooters fatally wounded - 'miserably cut about the head and other parts of the body' - and he reputedly sought refuge in the outbuildings around Stream Farm where he duly expired. It is claimed that on occasion his spirit has been seen staggering around, as if mortally wounded and in search of its deathbed...

Leading the 'ten shilling men' in pursuit of the smugglers was an excise officer said to come from 'Rounden' in Kent - this was a contemporary 18th century slang name for Rolvenden, situated between Benenden and Tenterden.

== Points of interest ==
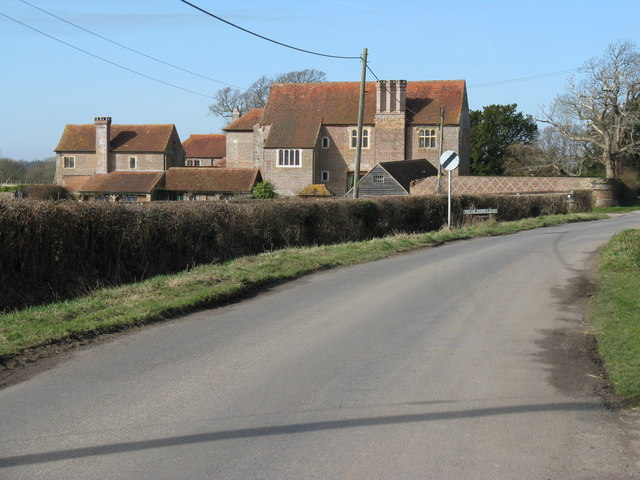
The Granary, the Farm and Chapel-Barn of Chiddingly Place

Burgh Hill Farm Meadow is a Site of Special Scientific Interest (SSSI) within the parish. This is a hedgerow-surrounded meadow of an uncommon grassland type.

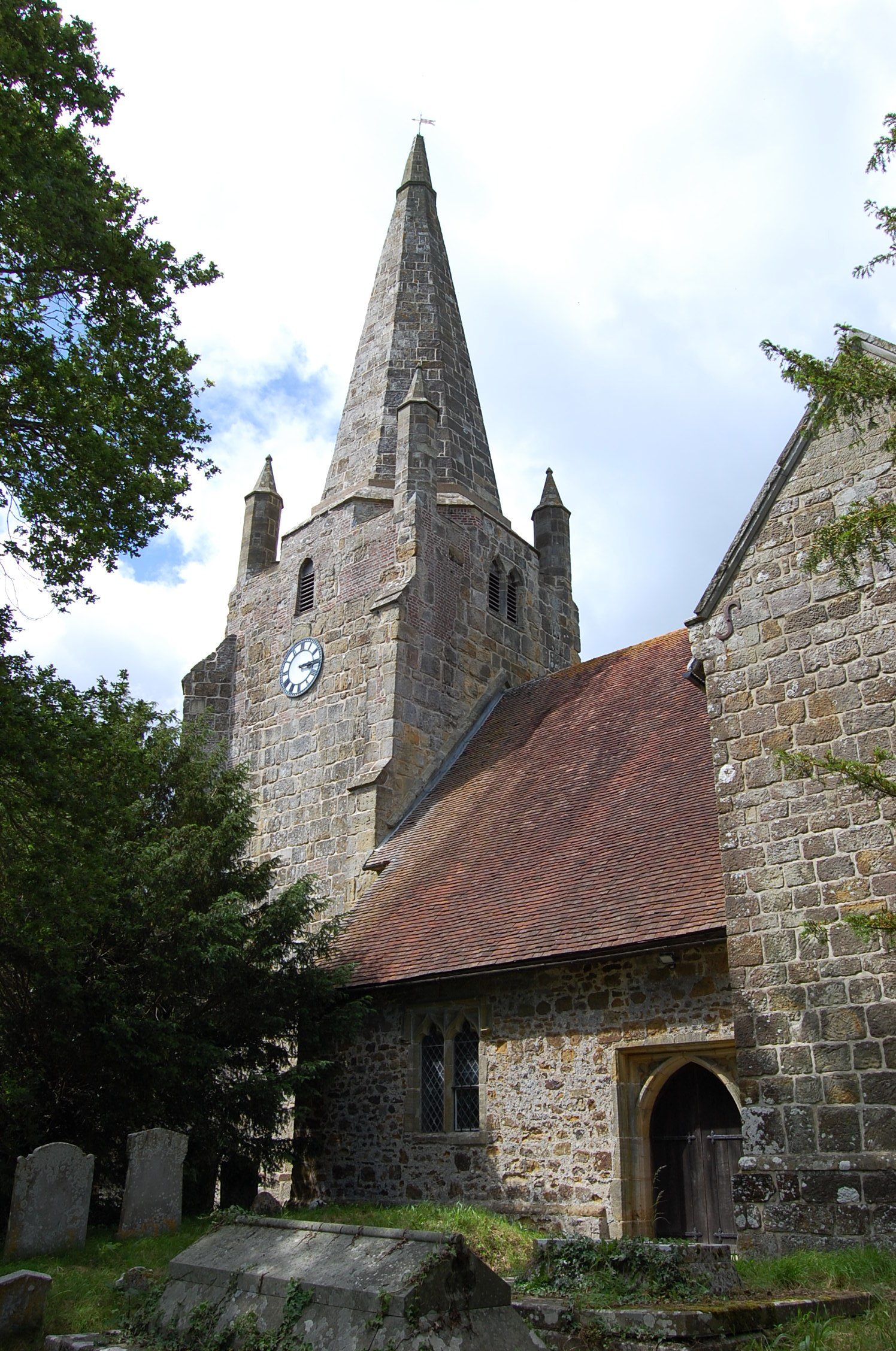
Chiddingly church

The Church of England parish church at Chiddingly is of unknown date and dedication, but references to it occur from the 13th century. Today the parish is part of a united benefice with the neighbouring parish of East Hoathly. A Congregational chapel was founded in Chiddingly in 1901.

Chiddingly has a primary school.

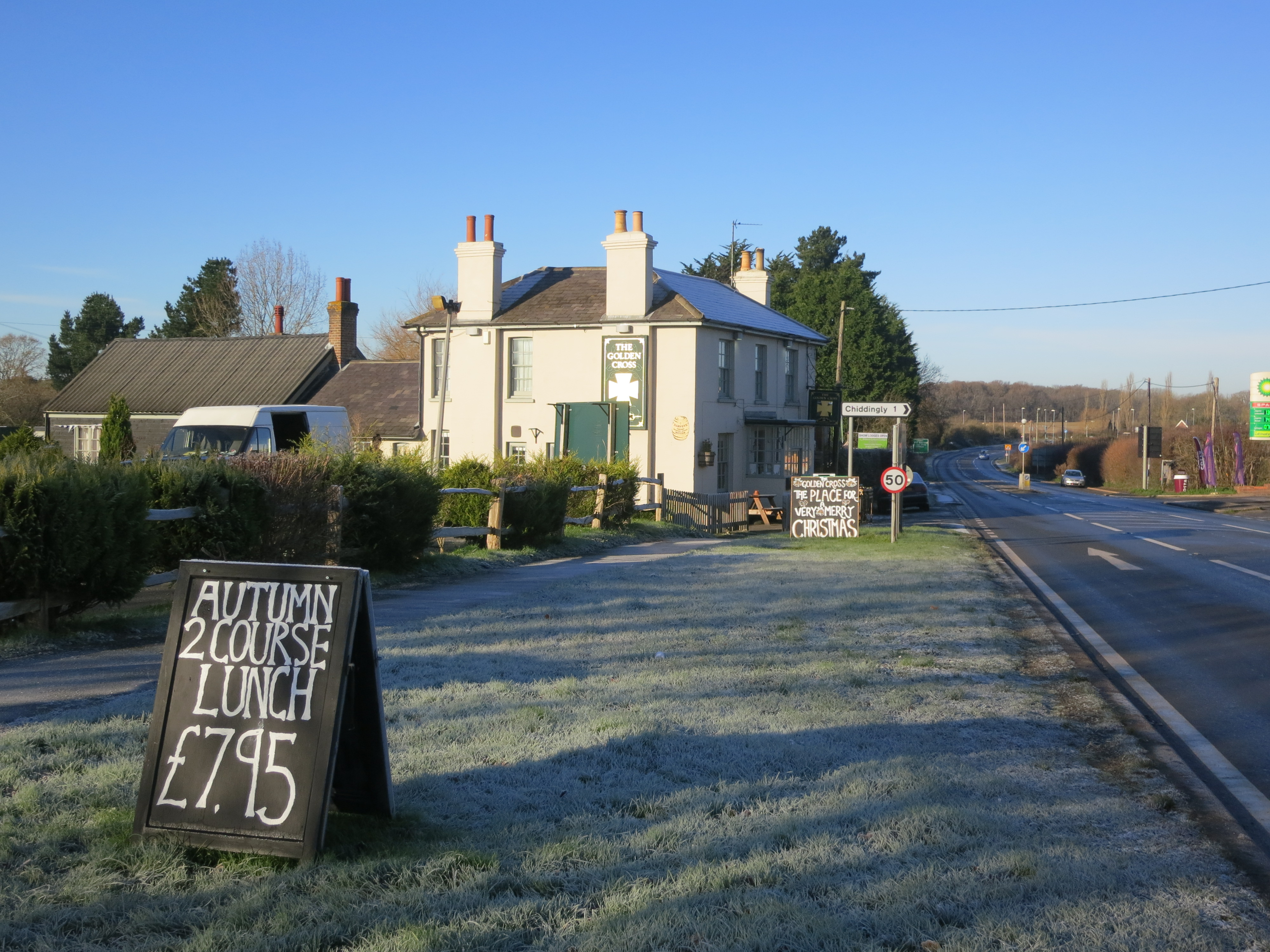
The Golden Cross

The annual Chiddingly Festival hosts an eclectic selection of artistic endeavours in and around the village each autumn, with performers of not insubstantial renown having taken their place in the programme over the years . Chiddingly had four public houses: The Six Bells Inn, in the centre of the village, and The Gun Inn - both of which are still open - The Golden Cross Inn (which closed in 2015 and has now been converted to flats) and The Bat & Ball at Holmes Hill, closed for many years and now a private residence. There was also a beer house known as the Rose & Crown opposite the end of Caldicotts Lane on The Dicker - though this was a few hundred yards 'over the border' in the neighbouring parish of Hellingly (its exact location is shown on a 19th-century Ordnance Survey map which can be viewed here).

The parish is also home to the Gun Brewery, which serves its own produce via a tap room, and hosts many functions and events during the course of the year.

Chiddingly has a village hall. Chiddingly also has a museum and archive. The Farley Farm House gallery features the lives and work of Roland Penrose and Lee Miller and is open for guided tours on pre-determined days.

Stone Hill is a well preserved medieval hall house dating from the 15th century, with a large park garden. In the early 20th century, the house was owned by J.M. Barrie, author of Peter Pan, who lived there until 1934. In the 1970s and 1980s the property was owned by composer and pianist Keith Emerson (founder of The Nice and Emerson, Lake & Palmer), who lived there with his family. At his Steinway piano in the barn he composed famous music pieces, such as "Karn Evil 9" and "Piano Concerto No.1".

There is a thriving bonfire society which represents the parish during the Sussex Bonfire season, and hosts its own event in late November. The Society was founded in October 2020, at the Six Bells public house with the ambition of creating a community asset for the Parish of Chiddingly. The Society represents Chiddingly at bonfire events across Sussex & Kent, and also introduces new members to the historic Sussex bonfire tradition.

Given the importance to the village of the iron industry since its first manifestation under the Romans, these celebrations also include reference to Old Clem's Night – traditional festivities intended to celebrate St Clement, patron saint of blacksmiths. At other locations where the same folk ritual is observed – and attended by genuine blacksmiths – a high point is 'the firing of the anvil' where a charge of black powder is placed in the hardy or pritchel hole of a real anvil, and ignited to general acclaim. The bonfire society instead fabricate an enormous anvil from heavy-duty cardboard, stuff it with pyrotechnics and blow the thing to pieces as a precursor to their main firework display.

On an associated tack, the fruits of the blacksmith's labours would often find their way to the workplace of a whitesmith - a craftsman who specialised in maintaining or restoring a usable cutting edge on bladed implements. This was a vital job in an largely agricultural community, ensuring that ploughshares, scythes, billhooks and other bladed tools were fit for purpose; the location of the most proximate practitioner of this particular art is indicated - of course - by the name of the hamlet of Whitesmith (where Forge Cottage can still be found) towards the western edge of the parish; this building is marked as a 'smithy' on this location map.

Historical pursuits in the village included a biannual 'rook shoot' around Latchett Wood which provided the staple ingredient of rook pie for the participants - a welcome addition to their usual impoverished agrarian fare - and, more esoterically, the recreation ground opposite the present school is marked on early ordnance survey maps as a 'wrestling place'. The village cricket club has been extant for many years, disporting themselves with enthusiasm and no little skill across the grounds of the county, although football and rugby seem only to have had prompted more fleeting interest, by way of ad hoc teams raised by patrons of The Six Bells when challenged.

In 1971 the film director Philip Trevelyan made the documentary film The Moon and the Sledgehammer about the Page family, who lived in a wood outside the village and operated two traction engines: an Allchin and a Fowler.

A maze of willow trees near Whitesmith was planted by a local farmer in the shape of a quotation from the bible.

Chiddingly village is adjacent to East Hoathly (a mile and three quarters away, as the crow flies); in West Sussex, to the south east of Crawley, the hamlet of Chiddinglye can be found in similar proximity to West Hoathly.

== Notable people ==
- Keith Emerson (1944–2016), English musician and composer.
- Alfred Feist (1835–1873), New Zealand preacher.
- Bob Hoskins (1942–2014), English actor, star of The Long Good Friday, On The Move and other film and TV productions.
- Lee Miller (1907–1977), American photographer and photojournalist.
- Roland Penrose (1900–1984), English artist, historian and poet.
