= Augustus Theodore Bartholomew =

British librarian (1882–1933)

- Bartholomew in 1923
- Born: 26 August 1882
- Died: 14 March 1933 (aged 50)
- Occupation: Librarian at Cambridge University Library

Augustus Theodore (Theo) Bartholomew (26 August 1882 – 14 March 1933) was a librarian at Cambridge University Library from 1900 until his death in 1933. He maintained friendships with a number of significant individuals, including Siegfried Sassoon, the novelist Forrest Reid and the uranian poet and librarian Charles Sayle. He was an editor, with Henry Festing Jones, of the works of Samuel Butler (published 1923–26) and collected materials for a biography of Frederick Rolfe.

== Life ==
=== Early life and education ===
Bartholomew was born in Walthamstow, the youngest of eight children to Alice Mary Bartholomew (née Chaplin) and Charles Augustus Bartholomew, his father having died shortly before his birth. His mother moved the family to Fowlmere, near Cambridge, and he attended the Nonconformist grammar school in Bishop's Stortford. His mother's lack of funds forced him to leave school at an early age, and seek employment nearby.

In spite of his limited education, Bartholomew felt from an early age a definite desire for a career in books. Initial enquiries to Robert Bowes' bookshop in Cambridge and the Bodleian Library in Oxford were unsuccessful, and he spent the summer of 1899 working in the Public Library in Norwich.

At the age of 17 he found a job as "Second-Class Assistant" at the University Library at Cambridge (then housed in the mostly medieval Old Schools building), and started work on 29 January 1900 earning 10 shillings a week. In 1901 he was able to enter Peterhouse, Cambridge, as an undergraduate, graduating in 1904 and moving from lodgings on Lensfield Road in Cambridge to Kellet Lodge on Tennis Court Road. In 1906 he became friends with the novelist Forrest Reid, and made his first visit to Venice in 1907, where he met the uranian poet Horatio Brown.

=== Sexuality ===
Bartholomew was homosexual. In his youth, he had been a member of the circle of handsome (and sometimes homosexual) young men who congregated at Charles Edward Sayle's house in Cambridge, including Rupert Brooke, George Mallory and Geoffrey Keynes, who remained a close friend throughout his life. Charles Sayle, employed at Cambridge University Library since 1893, became one of the chief figures in his life, taking the young Bartholomew under his wing. In 1909 they invited Henry James to visit Cambridge, where he stayed at Sayle's house. Sayle soon became insecure about his young friend deserting him (Sayle was 18 years Bartholomew's senior). But they remained friends until Sayle's death in 1924, by which time Bartholomew (now in his early forties) now suffered from similar anxieties of growing old in an ever-youthful university city.

He corresponded with authors he admired, including Edward Carpenter (to whom he wrote about the book 'Iolaus' in 1902 and whom he met in 1911), Magnus Hirschfeld (whom he met at one of Edward Dent's dinner parties in 1910) and Ralph Chubb (a younger Cambridge poet whose homosexual poems and paintings had inspired Bartholomew's interest).

=== Librarianship ===
After graduation he became part of the team tasked with cataloguing Lord Acton's library of 60,000 books, which he had donated to Cambridge. The task took nine years. He became Under-Librarian at Cambridge in 1913, a position he held until his death in 1933.

Books were of course one of his primary interests and in 1903 he was among the first members of the university's Baskerville Club. In 1909 he bought a copy of the Doves Press Shakespeare's Sonnets at a cost of £1 10s (which he called 'a horrible extravagance') and in November that year was sounded out by Sydney Cockerell about becoming Emery Walker's assistant. Through Geoffrey Keynes, he became acquainted with Gwen and Jacques Raverat (Gwen, a granddaughter of Charles Darwin, was the sister of Keynes' wife Margaret) and acquired a copy of Jacques' edition of William Blake's The marriage of heaven and hell (printed at the Ashendene Press in just 24 copies in 1910). With Keynes Bartholomew worked on John Evelyn, the two publishing a handlist of his works in 1916 (in 25 copies), and for a time Bartholomew worked on editing Evelyn's diary for publication until giving it up in 1921. He collected a wide range of books, including many on homosexuality and sexology.

In 1915 Bartholomew met Siegfried Sassoon and helped with the publication of his poetry, including Picture Show in 1919. Bartholomew's collection of Sassoon's works, and some of his manuscripts, is now at Cambridge University Library in the collection of Geoffrey Keynes. In 1917 Bartholomew became friends with the American typographer Bruce Rogers, who had been employed by Cambridge University Press. Rogers went on to design Bartholomew's bookplate along with several publications. Bartholomew also struck up a correspondence with Hilary Pepler (at the St Dominic's Press), and encouraged him to send copies of his private press material to Cambridge University Library.

Bartholomew was exempted from military service during World War I by reason of his poor eyesight. During the chaotic war years, Bartholomew's sane and precise habits became vital to the smooth functioning of the library. He provided much bibliographical structure for the Cambridge History of English Literature, edited by Sir Adolphus Ward and A. R. Waller.

== Literary work ==
Bartholomew left behind him not only his considerable contributions to the life of the University Library, but also his literary research, of which the most significant were his involvement in editing the works of the Victorian novelist Samuel Butler (novelist), and the gathering together of material on the life and work of Frederick Rolfe). His work on Butler began in 1910, when he heard a paper on his life by Henry Festing Jones. The two soon became friends, a relationship which culminated in Bartholomew's work on The Shrewsbury edition of the works of Samuel Butler, published in twenty volumes between 1923 and 1926. At Festing Jones' death in 1928, Butler's literary executorship passed to Bartholomew.

His work on Frederick Rolfe had a somewhat less happy ending. In 1918 he set about gathering material for a possible biography of the eccentric author, who had died in Venice in 1913. He compiled a scrapbook of material from various sources, including Rolfe's publisher Grant Richards, the uranian poet Horatio Brown (who had lived in Venice for much of his life) and Rolfe's family. But A. J. A. Symons, founder of the First Edition Club, published a piece on Rolfe in 1926 which focused on the more scandalous aspects of his life, and for reasons which are unknown, Bartholomew eventually gave up on his projected biography. At Bartholomew's death his precious scrapbook (now at the Harry Ransom Center in Texas) was lent to Symons, who used it extensively for his 1934 biography of Rolfe, entitled Quest for Corvo.

== Later life, and death ==
In 1926, Bartholomew began to suffer from bouts of depression, which eventually developed into an all-consuming melancholy. This serious affliction was quite satisfactorily cured by a programme of psychological intervention, to which Bartholomew agreed on condition it did not alter his homosexuality. In the years left to him, Bartholomew applied his characteristic sense of cleanliness and order to his new home in Millington Road. He had inherited good taste in furniture from his family, who came from a long line of cabinet-makers (George Bartholomew & Co. of Finsbury Pavement, London). To this he added his knowledge of books and prints, and with these he decorated his house (including his portrait, by John Wells, now hanging in the University Library), and so began to enjoy a well-deserved domestic comfort. His enjoyment was cut short; in 1932 he began to suffer from severe headaches, caused by high blood pressure. Within a year he was dead, at the age of 50. The task of writing Bartholomew's obituary fell to Keynes, one of his executors (along with Brian Hill and W. J. H. Sprott) who wrote:

He combined in a remarkable degree the qualities of human sympathy and common sense, and these with his imperturbable temper and wide knowledge made his small room in Cockerell's Building a constant place of call both for readers and for other members of the Library staff.

Bartholomew's diaries (covering the period 1904 to 1925) are housed at Cambridge University Library (MS Add.8786/1/3-14), and he also appears frequently in the diaries of Charles Sayle (CUL MS Add.8501-8510). An article on Bartholomew appeared in the Autumn 2016 issue of The Book Collector.
