= Elizabeth Hart =

Elizabeth Hart may refer to:

- Beth Hart (born 1972), American singer
- Betsy Hart (born c. 1963), American columnist
- Betty Harte (1882–1965), American actress
- Eliza Hart Spalding (1807–1851), American Presbyterian missionary, wife of Henry H. Spalding
- Elizabeth Anna Hart (1822–1890), British poet and novelist
- Elizabeth Hart, experimental musician from the band Psychic Ills
