= Nick Rosen =

Nick Rosen may refer to:

- Nick Rosen (British filmmaker)
- Nick Rosen (American filmmaker)
