= Maurice Barclay =

British landowner

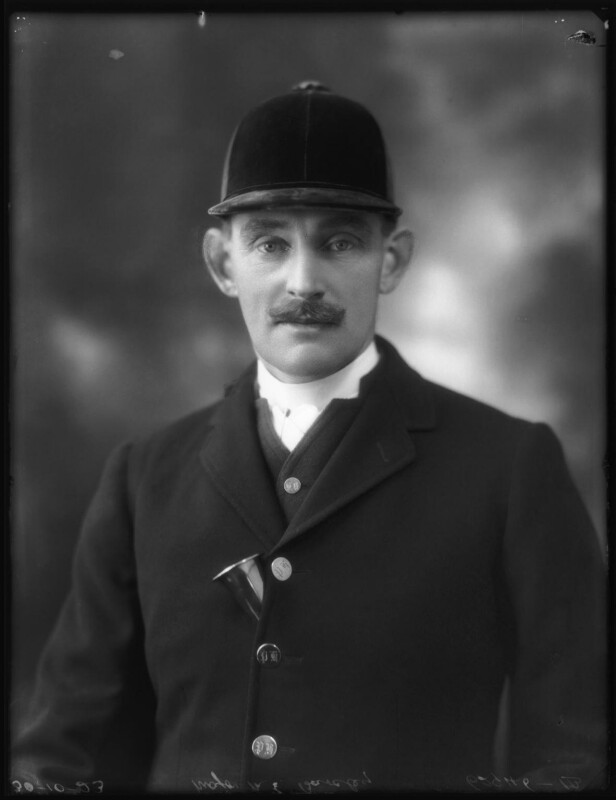
Barclay in 1923

Maurice Edward Barclay CBE TD DL (1886 – 9 November 1962) was an English landowner (of Brent Pelham Hall, Hertfordshire), agriculturalist and fox hunter.

Barclay was educated at Ludgrove School and Eton College, and Trinity College, Cambridge, where he was Master of the Trinity Foot Beagles.

In 1910 he became joint master of the Puckeridge Hunt with his father Edward Exton Barclay, and remained master for 52 years until his death, latterly with his own son Charles.

During the First World War, he served as an Officer in the British Army, second-in-command of the Norfolk Yeomanry with the rank of Major.

He was appointed a Commander of the Order of the British Empire (CBE) in 1950. He was also Deputy Lieutenant of Hertfordshire.

Barclay married Margaret, daughter of Marlborough R. Pryor, of Weston Park, Hitchin. The couple had two sons, Charles and William. The latter died aboard HMS Mahratta when she was sunk in February 1944.
