= The Moon and the Sledgehammer =

- Directed by: Philip Trevelyan
- Screenplay by: Philip Trevelyan
- Produced by: James Vaughan
- Cinematography: Richard Stanley
- Edited by: Barrie Vince
- Production company: Vaughan Films
- Release date: 1971
- Running time: 77 minutes
- Country: United Kingdom
- Language: English

The Moon and the Sledgehammer is a British 1971 cult documentary film directed and written by Philip Trevelyan and produced by Jimmy Vaughan.

== Premise ==
The film documents the eccentric lives of the Page family, consisting of the elderly Mr Page and his adult children Jim, Pete, Nancy and Kath, who live in a wood in Swanbrook, near Chiddingly, Sussex without main gas, electricity or running water. The sons find employment by fixing mechanical things as odd jobs and maintain two traction engines.

The film comprises interviews with the Page family, interspersed with footage of them going about their lives in the forest. It was shot using natural light on 16mm colour film. The sound is mono and there is no voice-over narration.

== Release ==
The film was previewed at the 1971 Berlin International Film Festival

== Reception ==
The first reviews were in the West German press. The British press subsequently picked it up resulting in short positive reviews by John Russell Taylor, David Robinson, George Melly, Dilys Powell.

The Monthly Film Bulletin wrote: "Accused in various quarters of being patronising, The Moon and the Sledgehammer in fact avoids every temptation to look down on its subject. There is no omniscient commentator to lend an ironic superiority to the camera's observations, only the Pages themselves talking at hypnotic length about each other, about pets, space travel and evolution, about the possibility of England's salvation through a return to steam power. It's easy to laugh at them, but impossible at the same time not to respect them for living out, rather than merely expounding, the belief that civilisation and blind technological advance are often backward steps in man's progress."

Patrick Barkham wrote in The Guardian: "From the first moment of the cult documentary, The Moon and the Sledgehammer, we are taken into a disturbing, marginal and strangely marvellous world."

Philip Oakes wrote in The Sunday Times: "A very remarkable film, and one which sets Trevelyan in a select band of movie makers.".

Andrew Schenker wrote in Slant Magazine: "Despite his pretense at an objective stance (apart from a single title card, the film features no narration), Trevelyan’s portrait of the family’s lifestyle is chiefly positive. ... one wonders what impact the introduction of the director’s modern equipment into their isolated lifestyle might have had on the participants ... But mostly the family seems unfazed by the film crew’s presence and the issue isn’t explored any further. In fact, given the film’s short running time, modest scope and lack of any contextualizing information, that’s far from the only question of interest the filmmaker fails to raise. Still taking into account the very specific parameters of Trevelyan’s project, what we get is finally of considerably more significance than what we don’t."

Time Out wrote: "As peculiar as it is hypnotic, Philip Trevelyan’s 1971 oddity documents a bold British family living off the grid in the Sussex woods. ... Gripping his camera, Trevelyan steps uncomfortably close to these craftspeople, molding an intimate family portrait that is at once perplexed and awestruck."

Nick Wrosen called the film "an oddball 1971 documentary."

== Home media ==
In 2009 the film was released on DVD for the first time. To coincide with this it had showings at various cinemas. A reunion of the director and crew and a question and answer session was held at the London showing. This forms the basis for a companion DVD, Behind the Moon and the Sledgehammer, a documentary film directed by Katy MacMillan. This also features film directors Nick Broomfield, Molly Dineen, Andrew Kotting and Ben Rivers and film historian John Russell Taylor discussing the film and its influence.

== In popular culture ==
Recording under the name Wyrdstone, Clive Murrell used a sample of audio from the fim in the track "Pucelancyrcan", which first appeared on the compilation album Wierdlore: Notes from the folk underground (Folk Police Recordings), and subsequently on the album Potemkin Village Fayre.
