= Codner =

Codner may refer to:

== People with the surname ==
- John Codner (1913–2008), British painter
- Maurice Codner (1888–1958), British painter
- Michael Codner (1920–1952), British soldier
- Nicholas Codner (born 2006), Canadian curler
- Robert Codner (born 1965), English football player

== See also ==
- Codner, Alberta, Canada
