= Gun Hill =

Gun Hill may refer to

- Gun (Staffordshire), a hill in Staffordshire, England
- Gun Hill, East Sussex, a hamlet in East Sussex, England
- Gun Hill Signal Station, a military outpost in Bermuda
- Gun Hill (film). a 2014 American television action film
- Gun Hill, a section of The Bronx in New York City where a Revolutionary War engagements took place and Gun Hill Road (road) is also named for

== See also ==
- Gun Hill Road (disambiguation)
