= Charles Edward Sayle =

English poet, literary scholar and librarian

Charles Edward Sayle from A. W. Pollard's obituary in The Library of 1924

Charles Edward Sayle (6 December 1864 – 4 July 1924) was an English Uranian poet, literary scholar and librarian.

He was the youngest son of Robert Sayle, the founder of a Cambridge department store, and Priscilla Caroline Sayle. Educated at Rugby School, he matriculated in 1883 at New College, Oxford. He returned to Cambridge and was engaged on cataloguing work in the libraries of St John's College, Cambridge and the Union Society. In 1893 he entered Cambridge University Library and served as an under-librarian.

His life was devoted to the library and to bibliography. He edited the Annals of the library, and his chief works for it were a Catalogue of Early English Printed Books, four vols., 1900–1907; a Catalogue of the Bradshaw Collection of Irish Books, three vols., 1916. He also made a catalogue of early printed books in the McClean Bequest to the Fitzwilliam Museum; and edited the works of Thomas Browne.

His works include Bertha: a story of love (1885), Wicliff: an historical drama (1887), Erotidia (1889), Musa Consolatrix (1893), Private Music (1911) and Cambridge Fragments (1913). He also edited an anthology of verse, In Praise of Music (1897) and compiled Annals of Cambridge University Library; 1278–1900 (1916). He edited the 3-volume Works of Sir Thomas Browne; volumes I & II were published in 1904 by Grant Richards in London; volume III was published in 1907 by John Grant in Edinburgh.

Charles Sayle's salon, a circle of bright, handsome and predominantly homosexual young men who congregated at his house on Trumpington Street, Cambridge, included Rupert Brooke, George Mallory, Augustus Bartholomew, Jacques Raverat and Geoffrey Keynes.

Sayle's publisher was Bernard Quaritch, a bookseller who specialised in unpopular but praiseworthy scholastic publications.
