= Norah C. James =

English novelist

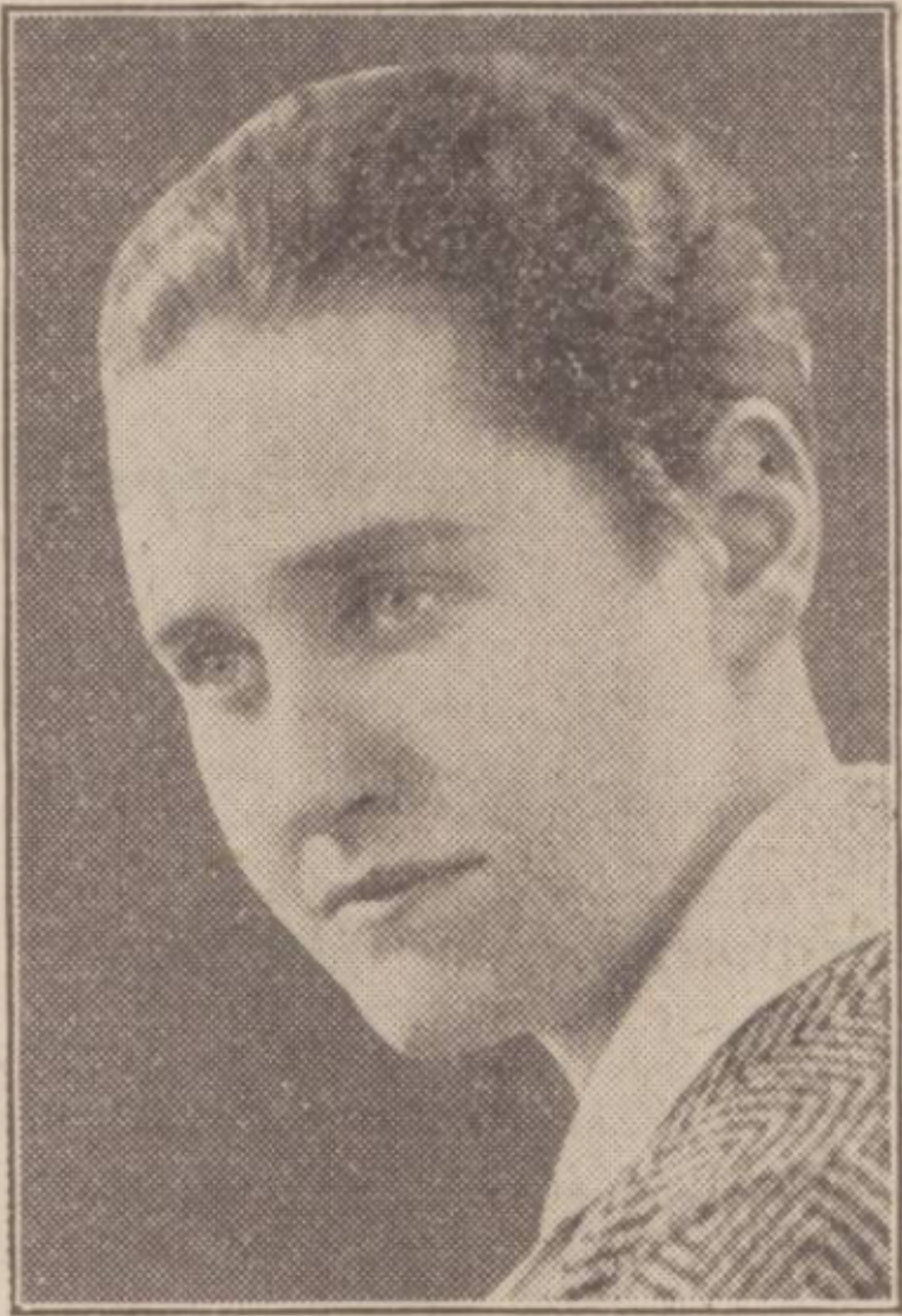
Norah C. James.

Norah Margaret Ruth Cordner James (1896 – 19 November 1979) was a prolific English novelist whose first book Sleeveless Errand (1929) was ruled obscene at the Bow Street Police Court.

== Early life ==
Norah James was born in Hampstead, London, in 1896, to John Henry Cordner-James and his wife Marie Cordner James. She had three brothers. Her father was a consulting mining engineer born in Redruth, Cornwall. Her mother was a British subject born in the United States. The family were living in Belsize Park Gardens at the time of the 1901 census and employed four servants.

== Career ==
According to a newspaper report in 1930, before taking up writing James had been a sculptor, a trade union organiser for civil servants, motor driver, a journalist, the advertising manager for a British publisher, and the political secretary to a parliamentary candidate.

Her first novel was Sleeveless Errand (1929) which was ruled obscene at the Bow Street Police Court for ‘excessive' use of 'bad language’. All but a few representative copies were ordered to be destroyed. The police had been tipped off about the content by the editor of the Morning Post after they had received a review copy. It was subsequently printed in Paris the same year by Jack Kahane's Obelisk Press. In 1934 it was described by the T. S. Matthews, the literary editor of Time magazine, in The New Republic, as "A story of post-war London; one of the few convincing suicide stories I remember." In 2013 it was described as "a story about jaded heterosexual bohemians."

Her second book was Hail! All Hail!, published by Scholartis Press in London in 1929, and as To the Valiant in the United States by William Morrow (1930). On a publicity trip to New York in 1930, she was described by a newspaper correspondent as "the new type of Englishwoman we've glimpsed on the stage in imported plays – a sturdy athletic young person with close cropped hair and blue eyes burning bright in a face deeply tanned."

Reviewing her fourth novel, Wanton Ways in The Spectator in 1931, Leonard Strong described James as "a stern moralist" but noted that "in her pages sin has no drama; its wages are not death, but a bilious headache."

In 1939 she published her autobiography I lived in a democracy, the title of which has been seen as ironic. During the Second World War she produced patriotic fiction such as Enduring Adventure (1944). She also wrote short stories, children's books, and non-fiction but increasingly turned to romantic novels, often with a hospital theme.

== Personal life ==
James knew the lesbian writer Radclyffe Hall and attended the trial for obscenity of her book The Well of Loneliness. Barbara Beauchamp was her partner in the later part of her life.

== Death and legacy ==
James died at University College Hospital, London, on 19 November 1979. Her home address prior to her death was 188 Naish Court Extension, Bemerton Street, Kings Cross, London N1. She left an estate of £3,449.

== Selected publications ==
Publications by James include:

=== 1920s ===
- Sleeveless Errand. Scholartis Press, London, 1929 — and after the book was banned in England: Sleeveless Errand. Henry Babon & Jack Kahane, Paris, 1929.
- Hail! All Hail! Scholartis Press, London, 1929 — published as To the Valiant in the U.S.

=== 1930s ===
- Shatter the Dream. Constable & Co., London, 1930.
- Wanton Ways. Duckworth, London, 1931.
- Hospital. Duckworth, London, 1932.
- Tinkle the Cat: An Animal Story. Dent, London, 1932.
- Jake the Dog: An Animal Story. Dent, London, 1933 — with Ruth Vale.
- Jealousy. Duckworth, London, 1933.
- Mrs Piffy: A Child's Eye View on Life. Dent, 1934 — photographs by C. C. Gaddum.
- Cottage Angles. Dent, London, 1935 — wood engravings by Gwendolen Raverat.
- The Lion Beat the Unicorn. Duckworth, London, 1935.
- The Return. Duckworth, London, 1935.
- By a Side Wind. Jarrolds, London, 1936.
- Sea View. Jarrolds, London, 1936.
- The Stars Are Fire. Cassell & Co., London, 1937.
- Women are Born to Listen. Cassell & Co., London, 1937.
- As High as the Sky. Cassell & Co., London, 1938.
- The House by the Tree. Cassell & Co., London, 1938.
- I Lived in a Democracy. Longman, London, 1939.
- Mighty City. Cassell & Co., London, 1939.

=== 1940s ===
- The Gentlewoman. Cassell & Co., London, 1940.
- The Hunted Heart. Cassell & Co., London, 1941.
- The Long Journey. Cassell & Co., London, 1941.
- Two Selfish People. Cassell & Co., London, 1942.
- Enduring Adventure. Cassell & Co., London, 1944.
- One Bright Day. Cassell & Co., London, 1945.
- Strap-Hangers. Bear Hudson, London, 1946.
- The Father. Cassell & Co., London, 1946.
- There Is Always Tomorrow. Macdonald & Co., London, 1946.
- Penny Trumpet. Macdonald & Co., London, 1947.
- Brittle Glory. Macdonald & Co., London, 1948.
- Swift to Sever. Macdonald & Co., London, 1949.
- Greenfingers and the Gourmet: a Background to Good Cooking. Nicholson & Watson, London, 1949 — with Barbara Beauchamp.

=== 1950s ===
- Pay the Piper. Macdonald & Co., London, 1950.
- Pedigree of Honey. Macdonald & Co., London, 1951.
- Cooking in Cider. The World's Work, Kingswood, 1952.
- So Runs the River. Macdonald & Co., London, 1952.
- Silent Corridors. Hutchinson, London, 1953.
- Summer Storm. Macdonald & Co., London, 1953.
- Over the Windmill. Hutchinson, London, 1954.
- Man without Honour. Modern Publishing Co., London, 1955.
- Wed to Earth. Hutchinson, London, 1955.
- Mercy in Your Hands. Hutchinson, London, 1956.
- The Flower and the Fruit. Hutchinson, London, 1957.
- The True and the Tender. Hutchinson, London, 1958.
- Portrait of a Patient. Hutchinson, London, 1959.
- The Shadow Between. Hutchinson, London, 1959.

=== 1960s ===
- The Uneasy Summer. Hutchinson, London, 1960.
- The Wind of Change. Hurst & Blackett, London, 1961.
- Tangled Destiny. Hamilton & Co. Stafford, London, 1961.
- A Sense of Loss. Hutchinson, London, 1962.
- Sister Veronica Greene. Hurst & Blackett, London, 1963.
- The Green Vista. Hurst & Blackett, London, 1963.
- Bright Day Renewed. Hurst & Blackett, London, 1964.
- Small Hotel. Hurst & Blackett, London, 1965.
- Hospital Angles. Hurst & Blackett, London, 1966.
- Double Take. Hurst & Blackett, London, 1967.
- Point of Return. Hurst & Blackett, London, 1968.

=== 1970s ===
- There is no Why. Hurst & Blackett, London, 1970. ISBN 0091005302
- Ward of Darkness. Hurst & Blackett, London, 1971. ISBN 0091059607
- If Only. Hurst & Blackett, London, 1972. ISBN 0091138000
- The Doctor's Marriage. Arrow Books, London, 1972. ISBN 0091093309
- The Bewildered Heart. Hurst & Blackett, London, 1973. ISBN 0091174104
- Love. Hurst & Blackett, London, 1975. ISBN 0091235308
