= Joseph Gurney Barclay =

Joseph Gurney Barclay may refer to:

- Joseph Gurney Barclay (missionary) (1879–1976), British banker and missionary
- Joseph Gurney Barclay (astronomer) (1816–1898), British banker and astronomer
