= Lucy Raverat =

British painter

- Born: 1948 (age 77–78)
- Occupation: painter
- Spouse: Francis Rawlinson (m. 1968)
- Children: 4

Lucy Raverat (née Pryor; born 1948) is the professional name used by Lucy Ethne Rawlinson, a British painter.

== Life ==
Born in Cambridge, Lucy Raverat is the daughter of Mark Pryor and Sophie Gurney (née Raverat), and granddaughter of the artists Gwen Raverat (née Darwin) and Jacques Raverat. Through her maternal grandmother, Lucy Raverat is a great-great-granddaughter of the naturalist Charles Darwin. In 1968 she married Francis Rawlinson and went on to have 4 children and 7 grandchildren.

Raverat was interested in art through her youth, and in the 1960s she attended Hornsey College of Art, where she completed a pre-diploma course. From there she travelled, spending time in India where she met her future husband, before moving to Lancaster. There she returned to painting, taking it up full-time after her children started attending school. In the 1990s she moved to France, where she currently resides.

Raverat often employs elements from her own life in her work, although they can be presented as "magically touched by fantasy", and she has incorporated representations of herself through the series painted for the Francis Kyle Gallery's Roma exhibition, "present in each composition as a tiny, wraith-like figure in a polka-dot dress".
