= M.G.M. Pryor =

M. G. M. Pryor
- Born: Mark Gillachrist Marlborough Pryor; 25 February 1915; Marylebone, London
- Died: 19 October 1970 (aged 55); Cambridge, Cambridgeshire
- Education: Eton College; Trinity College, Cambridge
- Spouse: Sophie Raverat (m. 1940)
- Children: 4 (including Lucy)
- Scientific career
- Fields: Biology
- Workplaces: Trinity College, Cambridge
- Doctoral advisor: A.D. Imms

Mark Gillachrist Marlborough Pryor (25 February 1915 – 19 October 1970) was a British biologist, who was Senior Tutor and Fellow of Trinity College, Cambridge.

Pryor was the middle son of Lt. Col. Walter Marlborough Pryor and his wife Ethne Philippa (née Moore), the daughter of Sir Norman Moore, 1st Baronet. His paternal grandfather was Marlborough Robert Pryor, who was an amateur naturalist "well known in Cambridge scientific circles". He was educated, per family tradition, at Eton and Trinity College, Cambridge. He worked as a research student under A.D. Imms.

Pryor married Sophie Raverat, daughter of the late French artist Jacques Raverat and his wife Gwendolen Mary (née Darwin) (a granddaughter of Charles Darwin), in 1940. They had four children: Emily Pryor (1942–2008), William Marlborough Pryor (born 1945), Lucy (known professionally as "Lucy Raverat", born 1948) and Amy Eleanor (born 1952, known as Nelly; she married her 3rd cousin, the film and television director Philip Trevelyan).

Pryor was elected a Fellow of Trinity College in 1939. Before the war, he published with P.F. Holmes a paper on barnacles in Horsey Mere in Nature. He also published a double paper on the hardening of oothecae and cuticles in insects.

During the Second World War, Pryor worked at the Timber and Adhesives Division of the Royal Aircraft Establishment, RAE Farnborough, where he applied his entomological knowledge to the development of aircraft glue, alongside Norman de Bruyne. After the war, de Bruyne continued commercial production of glues, but Pryor returned to Cambridge, where he continued his research. He collaborated on papers with, amongst others, John Tileston Edsall, Laurence Picken and Michael Swann and A.R. Todd, although for the slight majority of his papers he was the only author.

Pryor became a tutor at Trinity in 1955, and was later senior tutor until 1964.

In 1967 Mark and Sophie Pryor were involved in a road traffic accident, in which she was relatively unharmed but which left him with brain damage in a persistent vegetative state for almost three years until his death, aged 51.

There is a memorial brass to Pryor in Trinity College Chapel
