= Robert Pryor =

- Born: 21 April 1812; Middlesex, England
- Died: 23 August 1889 (aged 77)
- Education: Trinity College, Cambridge
- Occupations: Judge, barrister
- Spouse: Elizabeth Caroline Wyrley-Birch (m. 1844)

Robert Pryor DL JP (21 April 1812 - 23 August 1889) was an English barrister.

== Biography ==
Pryor was the second son of Thomas Marlborough Pryor (1777-1821), a Quaker of Hampstead Heath, Middlesex and his wife Hannah, daughter of Samuel Hoare a banker. His elder brother Marlborough Pryor (1807-1869) was JP, but had left no children.

Pryor was educated privately before being admitted to Trinity College, Cambridge in 1829 and graduating as fourth wrangler in 1834. This began somewhat of a tradition for Pryors of going to Trinity. He was admitted to Lincoln's Inn in 1834 and Called to the Bar in 1837. Professionally, he practised as an equity barrister and conveyancer.

On 20 August 1844 he married Elizabeth Caroline Wyrley-Birch, daughter of Wyrley-Birch, of Wretham Hall, Norfolk. They had four sons, one of whom died as a baby, the other three being sent to Eton before attending Trinity.

- Marlborough Robert Pryor (1848-1920)
- Frederick Robert Pryor (born and died 1851)
- Selwyn Robert Pryor (1855-1928)
- Francis Robert Pryor (1862-1937)

Pryor retired from the bar in 1863, and purchased for his residence High Elms Manor in Hertfordshire. There, he was a justice of the peace and succeeded James Grimston, 2nd Earl of Verulam as chairman of the Hertfordshire Quarter Sessions in 1867. For many years he was Chairman of the Watford Board of Guardians.

He was High Sheriff of Hertfordshire in 1868 and a Deputy Lieutenant of Hertfordshire from 1874.

For many years he was chairman of the Hertfordshire Liberal Association (qv Liberal Party). The Times described his political beliefs as being "of the type of John Bright".
