= Sophie Gurney =

English artist (1919–2011)

Sophie Jane Gurney (née Raverat, formerly Pryor; 20 December 1919 – 10 June 2011) was an English artist, linked to many of the leading intellectual and cultural figures of the early 20th century. As an artist she preferred brightly coloured variations on natural forms, working in both gouache and print. She later became a member of the 21 Group.

== Early life ==
Gurney was born in 1919, the younger daughter of English wood engraver Gwen Darwin and French painter Jacques Raverat. Gurney was a great-granddaughter of the naturalist Charles Darwin. Her father died in 1925 when she was only five years old. Gurney and her elder sister Elisabeth were temporarily taken into the care of her first cousin once removed Nora Barlow and her husband, Sir Alan Barlow.

She was educated at home in Cambridge and then at the Perse School for Girls, before studying violin in Switzerland. She was accepted by the Royal College of Music, switching to medicine just prior to the outbreak of World War II, but later abandoned her studies in 1940 after her marriage. She continued to play in orchestras and chamber groups throughout her life.

She first married the entomologist Mark Pryor in 1940; they had four children. Emily (1942–2008), William (born 1945), Lucy (born 1948) and Nelly (born 1952), who married the film director/farmer Philip Trevelyan. Sophie and Mark Pryor were involved in a road traffic accident in 1967, in which she was relatively unharmed but which left him with brain damage in a persistent vegetative state for almost three years until his death in 1970, aged 51. She also had to deal with her son William's heroin addiction.

She subsequently remarried, to Henry Charles Horton Gurney OBE (1913–1997, known as Charles), professor of mechanical engineering at the University of Hong Kong (1966–1973), who had been Mark's boss at RAE Farnborough. After his retirement, they moved to Totnes, Devon. Sophie Gurney died there in 2011, aged 91.
