= Marlborough Pryor =

English businessman (1848–1920)

- Born: October 16, 1848; Hertfordshire, United Kingdom
- Died: April 24, 1920 (aged 71)
- Education: Eton and Trinity College, Cambridge
- Occupation: Businessman
- Spouse: Catherine Alice Hammond Solly (m. 1875–1901)
- Father: Robert Pryor

Marlborough Robert Pryor DL JP (16 October 1848 – 24 April 1920) was an English businessman.

He was described in his Times obituary as a "savant, business expert and scholar" who was "a many sided man who devoted to business capacities which might have won him fame in science", while Nature described him as being "well known in scientific circles at Cambridge".

== Early life ==
He was the eldest son of Robert Pryor. He was educated at Eton and Trinity College, Cambridge (as had been his father, and younger brothers Frank and Selwyn). He was a member of the Cambridge Apostles.

== Career ==
In his business career, he was a merchant in Southern Africa, and later worked for the Sun Life Insurance Company.

He was also Deputy Lieutenant of Herts and a Justice of the Peace.

== Personal life ==
On 7 April 1875, he married Catherine Alice Hammond Solly, daughter of William Hammond Solly, of Serge Hill, Hertfordshire. Their son was the soldier Walter Marlborough Pryor. They also had six daughters; his wife died on 7 February 1901.

- Walter Marlborough Pryor DSO* DL JP (1880-1962).
- Ellen Catharine Pryor (1876-1951), married 1897 (div. 1919) Thomas George Sowerby.
- Frances Alice Hammond Pryor (1882-1935), married 1909 Philip Corbett Turnbull OBE.
- Elizabeth Mary Pryor (1884-1929) married 1908, Henry John Fordham (died 1926), married 2ndly Edward Exton Barclay, father of her brother-in-law Maurice Barclay (see below)
- Caroline Hilda Pryor (1885-1973), was unmarried.
- Margaret Eleanor Pryor (1887-?) married 1916, Maj Maurice Edward Barclay CBE.
- Hannah Mary (1890-1960), married 1916 Eric Cecil Guinness DSO.
