= Arthur William Allen Harker =

British soldier

- Born: 7 September 1890
- Died: 23 January 1960 (aged 69)
- Military career
- Allegiance: United Kingdom
- Branch: British Army
- Commands: Royal Army Ordnance Corps
- Conflicts: First World War; Second World War

Arthur William Allen Harker CBE (7 September 1890 – 23 January 1960) was a British soldier who served in both World Wars, and in the latter was a Brigadier in the Royal Army Ordnance Corps.

He was the son of James Allen Harker, professor at the Royal Agricultural College, Cirencester and his wife Lizzie Allen Harker. His older brother was Oswald Allen Harker, later Deputy Director General of MI5. He was educated at Cheltenham College and the Royal Military Academy, Woolwich.

In 1919 he married Mabel Violet Jeans, daughter of Maj. Gen. Charles Gilchrist Jeans CB. They had no children.

He was appointed CBE in 1941.
