= Lizzie Allen Harker =

English author (1863–1933)

Lizzie Allen Harker (née Watson; 1863 – 14 April 1933) was an English author.

Amongst her works are the play Marigold (with Francis R. Pryor), which was turned into a 1938 film Marigold. It was also broadcast on 22 May 1943 as one of the first episodes of BBC Radio's long-running drama strand Saturday Night Theatre.

She was born in Gloucester and educated at Cheltenham Ladies College. She was the wife (married 1885), and later widow, of James Allen Harker (1847–1894), professor at the Royal Agricultural College, Cirencester. Their sons were Oswald Allen Harker (1886–1968) and Brig. Arthur William Allen Harker CBE (1890–1960), and possibly more.

== Works ==
- A Romance of the Nursery (1902)
- Concerning Paul and Fiammetta (1906)
- His First Leave
- Miss Esperance and Mr Wycherly (1908)
- Master and Maid
- The Ffolliots of Redmarley
- Mr Wycherly's Wards
- Jan and her Job
- Children of the Dear Cotswolds
- Allegra (1919)
- The Bridge Across (1921)
- Her Proper Pride (with F.R. Pryor)
- The Really Romantic Age (1922)
- The Vagaries of Tod and Peter (1923)
- The Broken Bow (1924)
- Hilda Ware (1926)
- Marigold (with F.R. Pryor) (1927)
- Black Jack House (1929)
- Scenes from Marigold (1936)
