= HMS Puckeridge =

Destroyer of the Royal Navy

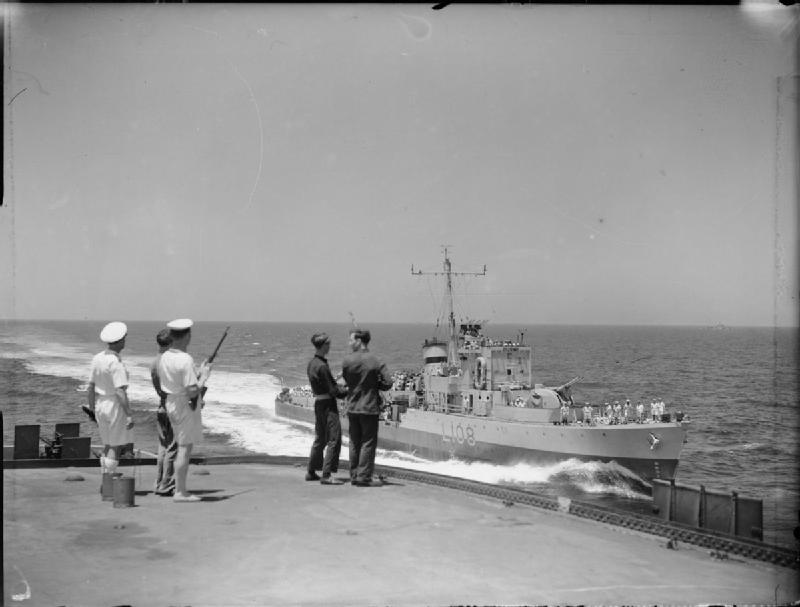
- HMS Puckeridge preparing for refueling at sea.

History

United Kingdom
- Name: Puckeridge
- Ordered: 4 September 1939
- Builder: J. Samuel White
- Laid down: 1 January 1940
- Launched: 6 March 1941
- Commissioned: 30 July 1941
- Honours and awards: English Channel 1942; North Africa 1942–43; Sicily 1943
- Fate: Sunk, 6 September 1943
- Badge: On a Field Red, a hunting horn Gold and a Battle Axe White in saltire interlaced with a horseshoe inverted also Gold

General characteristics
- Class & type: Hunt-class destroyer
- Displacement: 1,050 long tons (1,070 t) standard; 1,430 long tons (1,450 t) full load
- Length: 85.3 m (279 ft 10 in) o/a
- Beam: 9.6 m (31 ft 6 in)
- Draught: 2.51 m (8 ft 3 in)
- Propulsion: 2 Admiralty 3-drum boilers; 2 shaft Parsons geared turbines, 19,000 shp (14,000 kW)
- Speed: 27 knots (31 mph; 50 km/h); 25.5 kn (29.3 mph; 47.2 km/h) full
- Range: 3,600 nmi (6,700 km) at 14 kn (26 km/h)
- Complement: 164
- Armament: 6 × QF 4 in Mark XVI guns on twin mounts Mk. XIX; 4 × QF 2 pdr Mk. VIII on quad mount MK.VII; 2 × 20 mm Oerlikons on single mounts P Mk. III; 110 depth charges, 2 throwers, 3 racks

HMS Puckeridge was a Hunt-class destroyer of the Royal Navy and first and so far only warship to bear the Name. The vessel was ordered on 4 September 1939 as part of the 1939 wartime emergency program. She was laid down on 1 January 1940 at the J. Samuel White yard, East Cowes, on the Isle of Wight, launched on 6 March 1941 and commissioned on 30 July 1941.

Puckeridge was one of 33 Type II Hunt escort destroyers. The hulls of this second batch had an extra section and an increased beam which gave stability for a third twin 4 inch AA gun as originally designed and additional storage for depth charges. The class were named after British fox and stag hunts, in this case, the Puckeridge Hunt based in East Anglia.

== Service history ==
=== Home Fleet ===
In December 1941 Puckeridge was attached to the Home Fleet. On 13 December she was attacked by aircraft off the Pembroke coast and was hit by a bomb on her Quarterdeck which caused an explosion in her aft 4-inch magazine. 18 ratings were killed and 20 injured and her aft 4-inch gun was lost overboard. Damage control dealt with fires and the ship settled by the stern with the quarterdeck awash. When propulsion was restored, Puckeridge sailed to Milford Haven steering just by engines, before being towed to HM Dockyard, Pembroke Dock for repair and was eventually re-commissioned on 10 July 1942.

=== Western Approaches ===
After three months working-up and escorting Minelaying operations from Scapa Flow Puckeridge was deployed in the Western Approaches as a convoy escort. On 5 October she joined convoy WS23 then Escorted troopships Bergensfjord and Leopoldville from Freetown to Gibraltar.

=== Operation Torch ===
On 8 November 1942 Puckeridge supported landing operations at Oran during Operation Torch and later searched for survivors of Dutch destroyer HNLMS Isaac Sweers that had been sunk north-west of Algiers.

=== 1943 and fate ===
Puckeridge undertook patrols and escorting convoys from Gibraltar until 6 June 1943, when she was mobilised for Operation Husky, the Allied landing in Sicily, Italy, and was assigned to the East support force.

On 5 July she was assigned to protect convoy KMS18 convoy departing from Tunisia, and on 6 August Puckeridge escorted two passenger liners, MS Saturnia and MS Vulcania, from Gibraltar to Malta.

Fate

On 6 September 1943, around 20:15 hours Puckeridge was hit by two of four torpedoes fired by the German submarine U-617 commanded by Albrecht Brandi and sank 40 nautical miles (74 km; 46 mi) east of Gibraltar. The two hits aft detonated her magazine and she sank in 8 minutes. 129 men were rescued and 62 men were lost with the ship. Some survivors were rescued by a Spanish mercantile ship and avoided internment by attracting the attention of a naval patrol craft which took them back to Gibraltar. U-617 was later run aground and abandoned on 12 September 1943 near Melilla after an air attack by Royal Air Force Wellington bombers from 179 Squadron.

Puckeridge lies at a depth of 1,000 metres (3,300 ft) at 36°38′N 03°27′W and is a controlled site under the Protection of Military Remains Act.

== Publications ==
- Colledge, J. J. & Warlow, Ben: Ships of the Royal Navy - The Complete Record of all Fighting Ships of the Royal Navy from the 15th Century to the Present. Newbury, UK: Casemate, 2010. ISBN 978-1-935149-07-1
- English, John: The Hunts - A history of the design, development and careers of the 86 destroyers of this class built for the Royal and Allied Navies during World War II. Cumbria: World Ship Society, 1987. ISBN 0-905617-44-4
- Whitley, M. J.: Destroyers of World War Two – an international encyclopedia: Arms and Armour, 1988. ISBN 0-85368-910-5
- Gardiner, Robert; Chesneau, Roger, eds. (1980). Conway's All The World's Fighting Ships 1922–1946. London: Conway Maritime Press. ISBN 0-85177-146-7.
