= James Allen Harker =

James Allen Harker FLS (31 July 1847 – 19 December 1894) was an English entomologist, professor of natural history at the Royal Agricultural College in Cirencester, Gloucestershire from 1881 until his death.

He was a fellow of the Linnean Society from 1883. He was also a sometime correspondent of Charles Darwin.

He married in 1885 Lizzie Watson. Their sons were Oswald Allen Harker CBE (1886–1968) and Arthur William Allen Harker CBE (1890–1960). He died in 1894. After his death his widow had a successful career as an author.
