= Humphrey Barclay (priest) =

British priest (1882–1955)

Humphrey Gordon Barclay CVO MC (1882 – 2 October 1955) was a British Anglican priest. He was Chaplain to King George VI and Queen Elizabeth II.

Born in Bletchingley in 1882, he was the eldest son of Col. H. A. Barclay CVO, sometime aide-de-camp to King Edward VII and King George V. He was educated at Eton and Trinity Hall, Cambridge. On 26 July 1901 he was commissioned a second lieutenant in the Norfolk Yeomanry, a volunteer cavalry regiment, from which he reigned in February 1903. After further study at Lichfield Theological College, he was ordained in 1905.

During the First World War he served as a Padre, and on 1918 he was awarded the Military Cross. Thereafter he was Rector of Carlton Forehoe, 1918–20; of Southrepps, 1920–25, and of Tittleshall, 1925–39. He was appointed Domestic Chaplain at the St George's Chapel, Windsor Castle in 1940. He was made a Commander of the Royal Victorian Order in 1946.

In 1906 he married, Beatrice Eremar, daughter of Benjamin Bond Cabbell of Cromer Hall. They had two sons and three daughters. He lived at Southrepps Rectory.
