= Oswald Allen Harker =

Director General of M15 (1940–41)

Brigadier Oswald Harker CBE
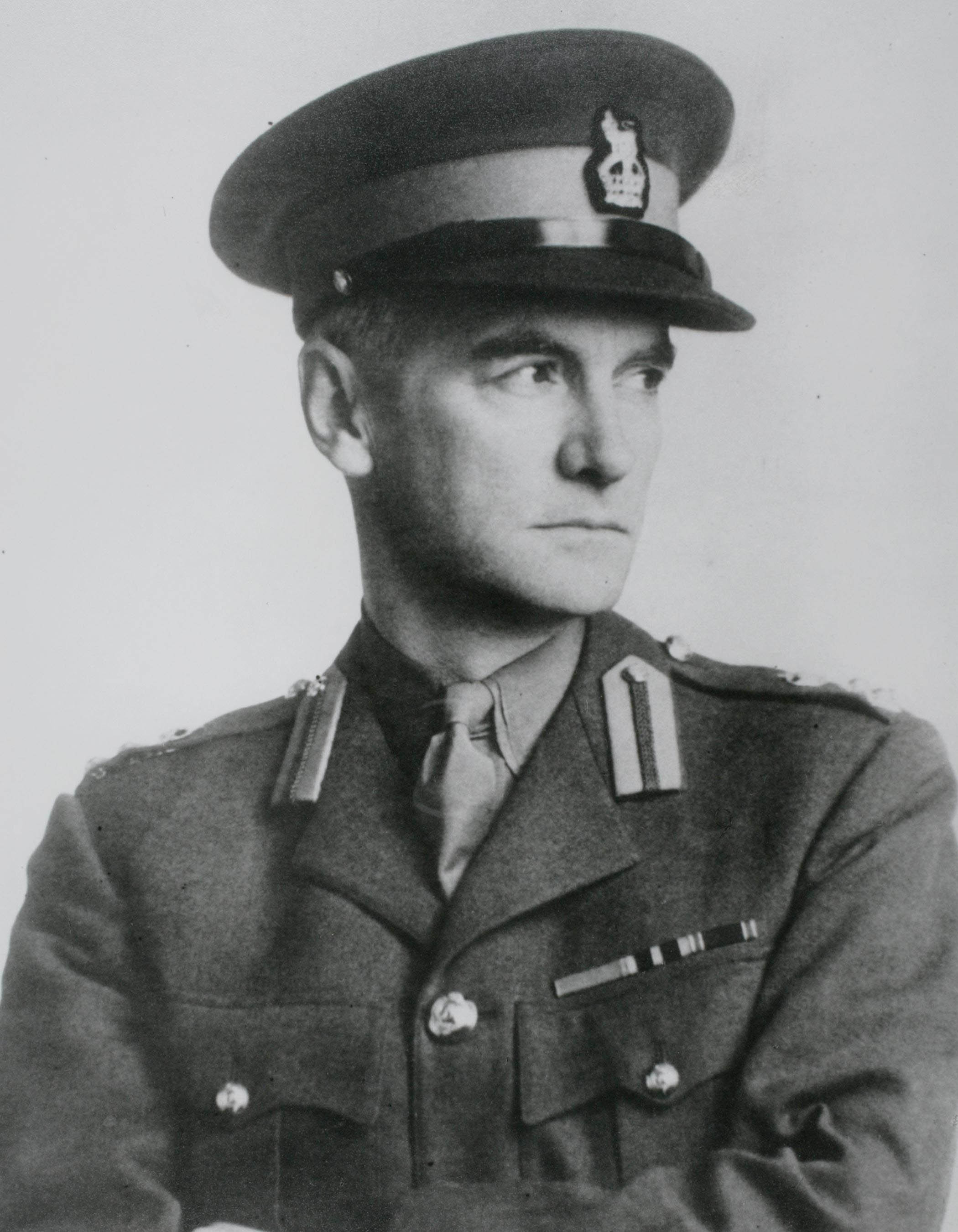
- Born: 1886
- Died: 1968 (aged 81–82)
- Other name: Jasper Harker
- Occupation: Intelligence officer
- Espionage activity
- Allegiance: United Kingdom
- Service branch: MI5
- Rank: Director General of MI5

Brigadier Oswald Allen Harker CBE (1886–1968), known as Jasper Harker, was Acting Director General of MI5 from 1940 to 1941.

== Background ==
Oswald Allen Harker was born in Cirencester in 1886, the son of James Allen Harker, a professor at the Royal Agricultural College, and his wife Lizzie Allen Harker. His younger brother was Brigadier Arthur William Allen Harker CBE.

== Career ==
Harker joined the Indian Police in 1905 and served as Deputy Commissioner of Police in Bombay during World War I. He joined MI5 in 1920, after being invalided home from India the previous year.

Harker served as the Deputy Director General prior to his promotion. He was promoted to acting Director General of MI5 in June 1940 when Major-General Sir Vernon Kell was dismissed. When Sir David Petrie was appointed as the new Director General in April 1941 Harker stepped down to be the Deputy Director General again.

Government offices
Preceded by Major-General Sir Vernon Kell	Director General of MI5 (acting); 1940–1941	Succeeded by Sir David Petrie
