= Saturday Night Theatre =

BBC radio drama strand, 1943–1996

- Genre: Drama
- Country of origin: United Kingdom
- Language: English
- Home station: BBC Home Service (1943–1967); BBC Radio 4 (1967–1996)
- Original release: 3 April 1943 – 29 June 1996

Saturday Night Theatre was a long-running radio drama strand on the BBC Home Service and its successor, BBC Radio 4. Launched in April 1943, the strand showcased feature-length, middlebrow single plays on Saturday evenings for more than fifty years. The plays featured included stage plays, book adaptations and original dramatisations. For most of its history, programmes ran for ninety minutes and were largely entertainment-centred, such as thrillers, comedies and mysteries.

== History ==
Saturday Night Theatre was noted as the major drama of the week on BBC Radio 4 from 1943 until September 1990 when the ninety minute regular slot was taken over by The Forsyte Chronicles, a serial of twenty-three hour-long episodes. When this was completed in March 1991, further serials were produced. The ninety minute regular slot for plays was finally scrapped in June 1996. Audiences had reached a peak of 6.75 million in 1955, but by the end the average audience levels had fallen to between 50,000 and 100,000, although with another 500,000 listening to the Monday afternoon repeat. Shorter plays continued to be broadcast on Radio 4 on Saturday evenings from 1996 until the relaunch of the channel's schedule in April 1998 by James Boyle, when single dramas were removed from the Saturday evening schedule.

Since 1998, the main weekly play on the station has been The Saturday Play, a daytime programme that runs for sixty to ninety minutes. There have since been campaigns to bring back Saturday Night Theatre, but in the context of BBC budget cuts, that have included the 2010 axing of Radio 4's Friday Play (established in 1998, when Saturday Night Theatre was abolished), any return looks unlikely.

== Episodes ==
Many plays, mainly from the 1940s (when they were usually broadcast live) all the way through to the early 1970s, are considered to be lost or destroyed. The earliest surviving audio is The Corn Is Green, by Emlyn Williams, adapted for radio by T. Rowland Hughes, which was broadcast on 27 January 1945, though re-discovered archive copies are still being found.

=== First ten episodes ===
- 3 April 1943: The Man With No Face, Dorothy L. Sayers, adapted by Audrey Lucas
- 10 April: Great Uncle Upton, a new play by Lionel Brown
- 17 April: Shall We Join the Ladies, play by J. M. Barrie
- 24 April: The Man Who Changed His Name, Edgar Wallace, adapted by Hugh Stewart
- 1 May: Consider Your Verdict, play revived for broadcasting by Norman Edwards
- 8 May: Parisian Ghost, new play by Peter Cheyney
- 15 May: The Brass Bottle, F T Anstey, adapted by Peggy Wallace and Moultrie Kelsall
- 22 May: Marigold: An Arcadian Comedy, Lizzie Allen Harker and Francis R. Pryor, adapted by Moultrie Kelsall
- 29 May: The Hairless Mexican, Somerset Maugham, adapted (from Ashenden) by Hugh Stewart
- 5 June: The House of the Arrow, A. E. W. Mason, adapted by Cynthia Pughe

=== Other notable episodes ===
- 15 January 1949: The Truth About Blayds by A. A. Milne, with John Turnbull and Marda Vanne
- 18 October 1958: Darkness at Pemberley by T. H. White, with Brewster Mason and Brian Haines
- 6 May 1961: The Storm by H.L.V. Fletcher, with Mary Wimbush and Oscar Quitak
- 3 December 1966: Home at Seven by R. C. Sherriff, with Patrick Barr, Isabel Dean and James Thomason
- 1 June 1968: Dangerous Corner by J. B. Priestley, with Flora Robson, David March and Gudrun Ure
- 7 February 1970: Malice at Autumn's End by John Hyatt, with John Bentley, Margot Boyd and John Gabriel
- 5 December 1970: An Ideal Husband by Oscar Wilde, with Ronald Lewis, Noel Johnson and Jane Wenham
- 6 October 1973: The Doubting Thomases by Mike Stott, with Alan Downer and Caroline John
- 25 December 1974: A Study in Scarlet, by Arthur Conan Doyle, with Robert Powell and Dinsdale Landen
- 18 December 1976: Colder Than Of Late by Ken Whitmore, with Judith Barker and Russell Dixon
- 22 September 1979: The Sins of the Father by Bill Lyons, with Douglas Livingstone and Nigel Hawthorne
- 27 October 1979: His Honour, by James Fairfax, with Ronald Baddiley and Malcolm Hayes
- 27 October 1980: The Cruel Sea by Nicholas Monsarrat (two hour adaptation), with Richard Pasco
- 18 April 1981: The Deep Blue Sea by Terence Rattigan, with Penelope Wilton and Michael Gambon
- 9 January 1982: The Case of the Late Pig, by Margery Allingham, with James Snell and Cyril Shaps
- 30 December 1989: The Price, by Arthur Miller, with Richard Dreyfuss, Amy Irving and Timothy West
- 30 March 1996: Under The Table by David Pownall, with Kenneth Cranham and Andrew Sachs
