= Marigold (1938 film) =

- Nicholas Hannen, Hugh Dempster and Sophie Stewart in a scene from the film
- Directed by: Thomas Bentley
- Screenplay by: Dudley Leslie
- Based on: play by Charles Garvice; Lizzie Allen Harker; Francis Robert Pryor
- Produced by: John W. Gossage; Walter C. Mycroft
- Starring: Sophie Stewart; Patrick Barr; Phyllis Dare; Edward Chapman
- Cinematography: Günther Krampf
- Edited by: Monica Kimick
- Music by: Anthony Collins
- Production company: Associated British Picture Corporation
- Distributed by: Associated British Film Distributors
- Release date: November 1938
- Running time: 74 minutes
- Country: United Kingdom
- Language: English
- Budget: £25,027

Marigold is a 1938 British drama film directed by Thomas Bentley and starring Sophie Stewart, Patrick Barr, Phyllis Dare, Edward Chapman and Pamela Stanley. The screenplay was by Dudley Leslie based on the 1914 play of the same title by Charles Garvice, Lizzie Allen Harker and Francis R. Pryor.

== Plot ==
Marigold, the daughter of stern Major Sellar, is engaged to James Payton, a local church elder. She has been raised believing she has no mother, whereas in fact the major and his wife are separated. One day two visitors arrive: actress Madame Marly, and dashing lieutenant Archie Forsyth. Marigold is invited to Edinburgh for Queen Victoria's visit, but Major Sellar and Payton refuse to allow her to go. She goes nevertheless, and visits Forsyth at his rooms in Edinburgh Castle. When the major arrives there is a scene, but Queen Victoria intervenes. It turns out that Madame Marly is Marigold's estranged mother. The family is reconiclied and Marigold jilts Payton for Forsyth.

== Cast ==
- Sophie Stewart as Marigold Sellar
- Patrick Barr as Lieutenant Archie Forsyth
- Phyllis Dare as Mme. Marly
- Edward Chapman as Mordan
- Nicholas Hannen as Major Sellar
- Hugh Dempster as Bobbie Townsend
- Pamela Stanley as Queen Victoria
- Ian McLean as James Paton
- Elliott Mason as Beenie
- Katie Johnson as Sarita Dunlop
- James Hayter as Peter Cloag

== Reception ==
The Monthly Film Bulletin wrote: "The story moves in a leisurely manner in keeping with its pleasant old-world atmosphere. It has refreshing wholesomeness and fragrance. The settings are exceptionally charming. Authentic backgrounds of Edinburgh Castle add interest, while the local scenery is delightfully portrayed. The character-drawing is good, and the acting reaches a high standard. Sophie Stewart has not an easy part, but she manages to make Marigold credibly innocent, gay, rebellious, and attractive. Patrick Barr is convincingly dashing, and appears not uncomfortable in costume. Thoroughly competent players give effective support. The Scottish accents may present occasional difficulties to Southern ears."

The Daily Film Renter wrote: "Charming period romance adapted from famous West End stage play, Sophie Stewart successfully repeating footlights role of spirited Scots girl who throws over staid Kirk elder for dashing young army officer, their union receiving personal blessing of Queen Victoria. Quaint old-world atmosphere of manse admirably captured, while authentic shots of Edinburgh Castle and picturesque Highland exteriors also in evidence. Delightful entertainment of wholesome type, with title affording strong selling angles."

Kine Weekly wrote: "Picturesque Scottish romantic comedy costume piece, smoothly adapted from the phenomenal Kingsway theatre stage success. The entertainment is unhurried, but it comains the graceful charm, gentle humour and kindly fragrance of 'Quality Street,' and these attributes should endear it to good class and family audiences. The acting leaves nothing to be desired, and neither does the atmosphere, most of which is authentic. Title values are, of course, considerable. Pleasing light refreshment tor the majority."

Picturegoer wrote: "There is rather too much dialogue and not enough action but it entertains fairly well. A highlight is the reproduction of Queen Victoria's visit to Edinburgh Castle."

Picture Show wrote: "There is a freshness and charm about this romantic comedy. ... Sophie Stewart is delightful as Marigold, who runs away to Edinburgh to see her sweetheart – a part convincingly played by Patrick Barr. The rest of the cast is good, and settings excellent."
