= Alfred Feist =

New Zealand brethren preacher

Alfred Feist (21 February 1835 – 3 December 1873) was a New Zealand brethren preacher. He was born in Chiddingly, Sussex, England on 21 February 1835.
