= Gun Hill Road =

Gun Hill Road or Gunhill Road may refer to:

- Gun Hill Road (road), a major thoroughfare in the New York City borough of The Bronx
- Gun Hill Road (film), a 2011 film set in The Bronx
- Gun Hill Road (IRT Dyre Avenue Line), a New York City Subway station at Seymour Avenue in the Bronx
- Gun Hill Road (IRT White Plains Road Line), a New York City Subway station at White Plains Road in the Bronx
- Gunhill Road, an American band

== See also ==
- Gun Hill (disambiguation)
