= Henry Festing Jones =

English solicitor and writer (1851–1928)

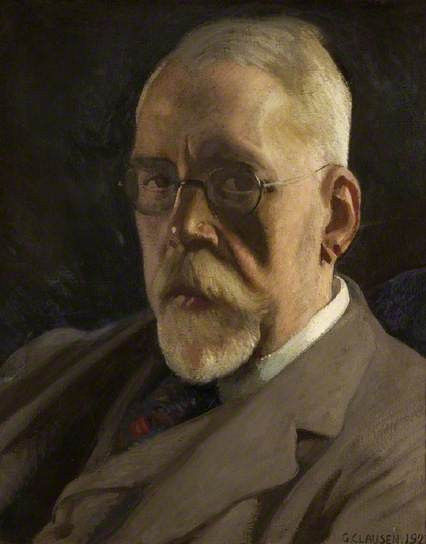
Henry Festing Jones, 1923 portrait by George Clausen

Henry Festing Jones (30 January 1851 – 23 October 1928) was an English solicitor and writer, known as the friend and posthumous biographer of Samuel Butler.

== Life ==
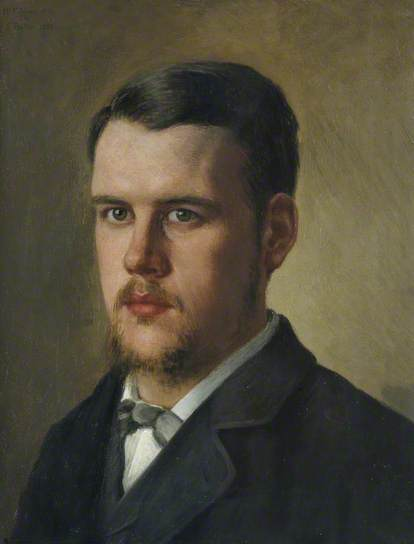
Henry Festing Jones in 1882. Oil painting by Samuel Butler

He was the son of Thomas Jones Q.C., and entered Trinity Hall, Cambridge, in 1870. Graduating B.A. in 1873, he was articled to a solicitor. He qualified in the profession in 1876.

Jones met Samuel Butler through Edward Hall, a college friend; they became close in 1876. From 1887, he was Butler's paid companion and musical collaborator. Two of the musical works they worked on together were the cantatas Narcissus (private rehearsal 1886, published 1888), and Ulysses, both for solo voices, chorus and orchestra, in imitation of Handel. Butler had settled in 1864 in Clifford's Inn, London, where he lived for the rest of his life, dying in 1902; Jones lived in Barnard's Inn and Staple Inn during Butler's lifetime.

After Butler's death, Jones moved within London to Maida Vale, where his sister kept house for him. He advised Butler's executors (Reginald Worsley, and R. A. Streatfeild, his literary executor). He organised annual "Erewhon Dinners" in Butler's memory, from 1908 to 1914, at the suggestion of Marcus Hartog. P. N. Furbank has criticised the editorial stance Jones took, and the effort to make Butler "respectable".

== Work on Samuel Butler's legacy ==
In 1910 Jones met Francis Darwin, in an attempt to close the feud between Butler and Charles Darwin that had arisen around 1880; the result was a pamphlet, Charles Darwin and Samuel Butler: A Step toward Reconciliation (1911).

Jones published a well-regarded selection, The Note-Books of Samuel Butler (1912), after Desmond MacCarthy had seen the originals and published extracts in the New Quarterly Review. The editing of this work has been seen as involving false emphasis and polishing of the originals, producing an effect of a "cross between Oscar Wilde and Dr Johnson". In 1919, his two volume biography of Butler, entitled Samuel Butler, Author of Erewhon (1835–1902): A Memoir, won the inaugural James Tait Black Memorial Prize for a biography.

Jones edited Butler's works with Augustus Theodore Bartholomew, known as Theo and a librarian and bibliographer in Cambridge, in 20 volumes, which appeared in 1923–1926. On Bartholomew's death in 1933, Geoffrey Keynes became his literary executor, also taking on the papers of Jones and Butler, acting with Brian Hill.

== Later life ==
Through Theo Bartholomew, Jones came to know Siegfried Sassoon, meeting after World War I; Sassoon and others knew him as "Enrico". They corresponded, and Sassoon found Jones a sympathetic audience. Bartholomew and Mansfield Forbes visited Jones, and gave him "guru" status. Geoffrey Keynes and his wife were good friends.

== Other works ==
- Diversions in Sicily (1909)
- Castellinaria, and Other Sicilian Diversions (1911)
- Mont Eryx, and Other Diversions of Travel (1921)

Jones was a student of the Opera dei Pupi. Butler had visited Sicily almost annually in the last decade of his life, usually with Jones.
