= Gun Hill, East Sussex =

Hamlet in East Sussex, England

Coordinates: 50.909598°N 0.225733°E

Gun Hill
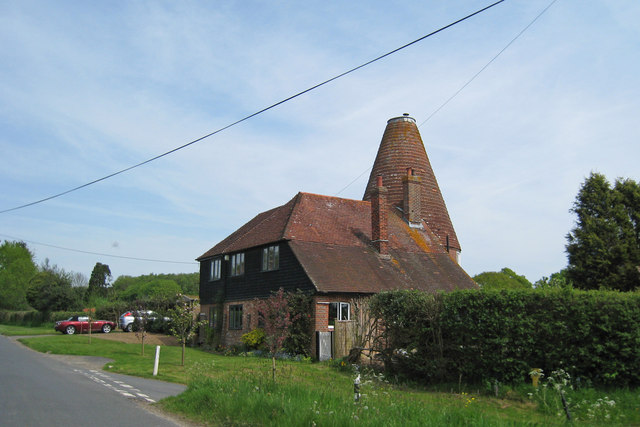
- Oast house on Chiddingly Road

- Location within East Sussex
- OS grid reference: TQ5657514596
- Civil parish: Chiddingly
- District: Wealden
- Shire county: East Sussex
- Region: South East
- Country: England
- Sovereign state: United Kingdom
- Post town: HEATHFIELD
- Postcode district: TN21
- Dialling code: 01323
- Police: Sussex
- Fire: East Sussex
- Ambulance: South East Coast
- UK Parliament: Wealden

Gun Hill is a hamlet in the civil parish of Chiddingly in the Wealden district of East Sussex, England. It is one of the seven hills of the parish in which it stands.

The nearest town is Uckfield, which lies approximately 7 miles (11 km) north-west from the village. The hamlet is where Wealden and Wealdway cheeses are produced.
