= Francis R. Pryor =

English playwright (1862–1937)

Francis Robert "Frank" Pryor (30 March 1862 – 4 December 1937) was an English playwright.

Pryor was the youngest son of Robert Pryor of High Elms, Hertfordshire and his wife Elizabeth Caroline née Wyrley-Birch.

He was educated at Eton and Trinity College, Cambridge.

He was the author, jointly with Lizzie Allen Harker, of the 1914 comedy play Marigold, which was turned into a 1938 film Marigold. It was also broadcast on 22 May 1943 as one of the first episodes of BBC Radio's long-running drama strand Saturday Night Theatre. Despite working on a number of plays however, Marigold was his only success. She was also the author of the BBC production "Scenes from Marigold".

He was also a director of Allsopp's Brewery, and an Underwriter at Lloyd's of London.

An obituary by Laurence Binyon was published in The Times. He never married.
