= Elizabeth Anna Hart =

British poet and novelist

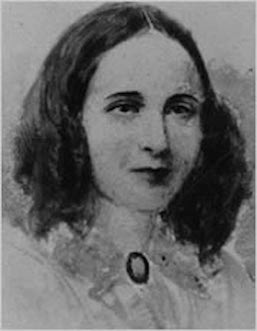
- Elizabeth Anna Hart
- Born: Elizabeth Anna Smedley; 1822; London, England
- Died: 1890 (aged 67–68)
- Occupations: Poet, writer
- Writing career
- Genres: Poetry, Children's Literature

Elizabeth Anna Hart, née Smedley (1822–1890), was a British poet and novelist born in London. She was a cousin of Lewis Carroll's through her aunt, Lucy Dodgson née Hume, who was Carroll's grandmother. Hart wrote children's poetry with her sister Menella Bute Smedley as well as novels, including Mrs. Jerningham's Journal and The Runaway.

== Biography ==
Hart was born in 1822 to Mary Hume Smedley and Rev. Edward Smedley, a clergyman, critic, and poet. She married Thomas Barnard Hart, brother of Sir Andrew Hart, and a cousin of hers through his mother Maria Hume, an officer in the Indian Army, and had no children.

== Writing ==
Wood-engraver Gwen Raverat was a fan of Hart's 1872 novel The Runaway, which the artist described as "a gay, rather farcical book, which was the delight of my own childhood (and I supposed of the generation before as well) and has been very much loved by my own children, and by many others". Raverat asked publishing house Macmillan to publish an edition of the novel with her art. The Runaway was reissued in 1936 with sixty of Raverat's engravings after Duckworth accepted the project.

The Runaway was also reissued by Persephone Books with afterwords from Anne Harvey and Frances Spalding.

== Legacy ==
Her novel, Wilfred's Widow, was met with positive reviews. The Athenaeum praised Hart for "that quiet humour in which women...so often excel....The style is bright and simple throughout, without any affectation of cleverness, and the characters appear as clearly as if they had been forced to unfold themselves in whole chapters of self-analysis."

The Runaway has been labelled a children's classic. Ellen Brink's "Two Girls in Love: Romantic Friendship and the Queer Family in Elizabeth Anna Hart's The Runaway" presents a queer reading of the story, arguing the novel "gives a new validity to same-sex adolescent desire as something that is not merely one moment or a phase, to be cast off in a developmental narrative of 'growth' towards adulthood" by Hart "[imagining] a queer family of two in which it can grow and flourish".

== Works ==
- Mrs. Jerningham’s Journal (1869)
- Child-World (1869)
- The Runaway: a Story for the Young (1872)
- A Very Young Couple (1873)
- Paws and Claws: Being True Stories of Clever Creatures, Tame and Wild (1874)
- Miss Hitchcock’s Wedding-Dress (1875)
- Tiny Houses and Their Builders (1876)
- Harry (1877)
- Silver wings and golden scales (1877)
- Freda (1878)
- Very Genteel (1880)
- Two fourpenny bits (1880)
- Poor Nelly (1880)
- Wilfred's Widow (1883)
- May Cunningham’s trial (1883)
- Mr. Burke’s nieces (1883)
