= Burgh Hill Farm Meadow =

Protected area in East Sussex, England

Coordinates: 50.894°N 0.184°E

- Site of Special Scientific Interest
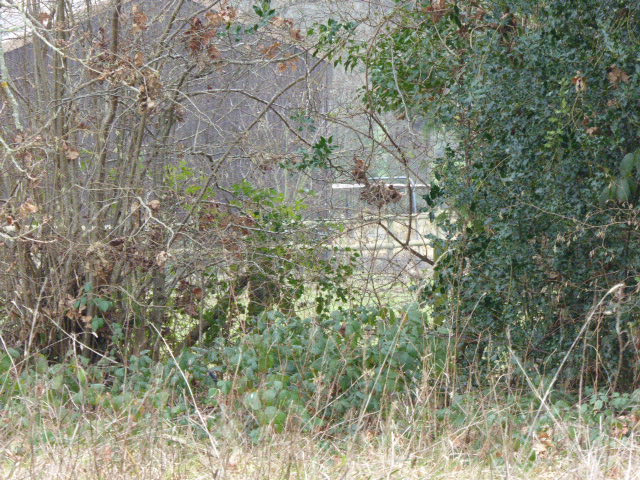
- Location of Burgh Hill Farm Meadow.
- Area of search: East Sussex
- Grid reference: TQ 537 128
- Interest: Biological
- Area: 0.9 hectares (2.2 acres)
- Notification date: 1984
- Location map: Magic Map

Burgh Hill Farm Meadow is a 0.9-hectare (2.2-acre) biological Site of Special Scientific Interest west of Hailsham in East Sussex.

This meadow is managed to encourage wildlife and 67 species of flowering plants have been recorded, such as yellow rattle, pepper saxifrage and green winged orchid. The site also has a ditch, two small ponds and mature hedgerows.

The site is private land with no public access.
