= H. A. Barclay =

Henry Albert Barclay CVO TD DL JP (19 April 1858 - 19 August 1947) was a British soldier.

== Biography ==
Barclay was the son of Joseph Gurney Barclay (astronomer) and was educated at Trinity Hall, Cambridge.

He served in the Army, and was colonel of the King's Own Norfolk Imperial Yeomanry, which he raised in 1900 until his retirement in 1913. The regiment often took part in ceremonial during visits of the monarchs to Sandringham House in Norfolk. He was aide-de-camp to King Edward VII, 1906–10 and King George V, 1910–25.

He was appointed a Member of the Royal Victorian Order (fourth class - MVO) in December 1901 and promoted to Commander (CVO) of that Order in 1906. He was also a Commander of the Order of St Olav of Norway, due to the Norwegian King's connection to the Norfolk Yeomanry.

He was of Hanworth Hall in Norfolk.

His son was Humphrey Barclay CVO.
