= Philip Trevelyan =

British organic hill farmer, entrepreneur and director

Philip Erasmus Trevelyan (born 22 August 1943) is a British organic hill farmer, entrepreneur and former film and television director, most noted for the 1971 documentary film The Moon and the Sledgehammer.

== Early life ==
He is the son of the artist and poet Julian Trevelyan (1910–1988) and his first wife, the potter Ursula Darwin (later Mommens) (1908–2010). Trevelyan was educated at Bryanston School and the Fine Arts Dept of Kings College, Newcastle. Later, he attended an MA course at the Royal College of Art (Dept of Film & TV).

== Film career ==
While at the RCA, he directed and edited the film Lambing (1964, 20 mins, 16mm, black and white), which was awarded the National Nature Film Festival 1st prize and was broadcast on BBC TV. His second film was The Ship Hotel, Tyne Maine (1966, 35 mins, 16mm, black and white), a documentary centred on a Tyneside pub, concentrating on a group of people who go there every Sunday to drink and sing. This was awarded a silver medal by the Royal College of Art. His third film as director was The Farmer's Hunt (1968, 40 mins, 16mm colour), a BBC film of stag hunting on Exmoor. His fourth film was The Moon and the Sledgehammer (1971, 65 mins 16mm colour). His next film was Big Ware (1971, 16mm colour 40 mins), a TV documentary about George Curtis, a traditionalist potter. Between 1972 and 1974, he directed seven titles of the series Portraits of Places, written by and featuring Ray Gosling.

In 1976, Trevelyan was hired to direct a dramatised film about the Mongols and the building of Isfahan, to be produced by David Frost, however the Iranian Revolution curtailed the project. His next film was co-director and editor of a film entitled Basil Bunting (1979, 16mm colour, 60 mins), which was shown at London and Cannes. K.491 (1979, 16mm colour 60 mins) was an exploration film about Mozart's Piano Concerto No. 24. His last film was in 1985, Surrealism in Liverpool (with commentary by George Melly), a Granada TV film celebrating Surrealism and the arrival of an international exhibition as the new Tate Liverpool.

== Farming ==
In 1974, the Trevelyans bought a hill farm, Hill Top Farm in Spaunton, North Yorkshire. The farm was certified organic by the Soil Association in 1985, and they aim to follow sustainable farming practices. They farm Swaledale sheep to produce shearlings primarily for meat that is sold locally but also for wool. Rabbits, a pest, are killed and also sold for meat. The farm has wind turbines and solar panels to generate electricity, which is used to power freezers for meat and a Kewet electric car.

In 1997, Trevelyan founded the "Lazy Dog Tool Company", which specialises in handmade hand tools for "chemical-free weed control". The tools are instead designed for weeding by the traditional, but labour intensive, practice of removing individual plants (RIP). The tools are ergonomically designed and are manufactured from stainless steel at the workshop, on the farm. The tools are popular with organic farmers (who have restrictions on the use of herbicides), conservation groups (who have volunteer labour), and horse owners (who need to remove poisonous common ragwort from fields with horses in). This has featured on Gardeners' World (2002). In 2003, it was awarded a Green Apple Award by The Green Organisation.

In 2005, Trevelyan also started a flour milling company Yorkshire Organic Millers, to mill locally-grown organic wheat. On 23 January 2008, Hill Top Farm was visited by HRH The Prince of Wales.

In 2013, Trevelyan published a book entitled Julian Trevelyan: Picture Language, a pictorial exploration of the life of his father Julian. Andrew Lambirth, writing in The Daily Telegraph, commented that the book "is an anecdotal and appreciative account of [Julian Trevelyan's] art. It makes riveting reading, but the real surprise is the richness and variety of the illustrations, many previously unknown." An exhibition was held at Bohun Gallery in Henley-on-Thames, in association with the publication of the book.

== Personal life ==
In 1974, he married Amy Eleanor Pryor (known as Nelly), youngest daughter of the entomologist M.G.M. Pryor and his wife Sophie, herself granddaughter maternally of George Darwin (a son of Charles Darwin). The Trevelyans have two sons, Jack (born John Robert Trevelyan in 1977) and Matthew Robert (born 1979), and a daughter, Susannah (born 1987), an independent film maker.
