= John Henry Cordner-James =

20th century English businessman

John Henry Cordner-James (30th July 1857 in Redruth, Cornwall – 20th April 1946 in Aldeburgh, Suffolk) was a leading British businessman of the early 20th century and a mining pioneer with global interests.

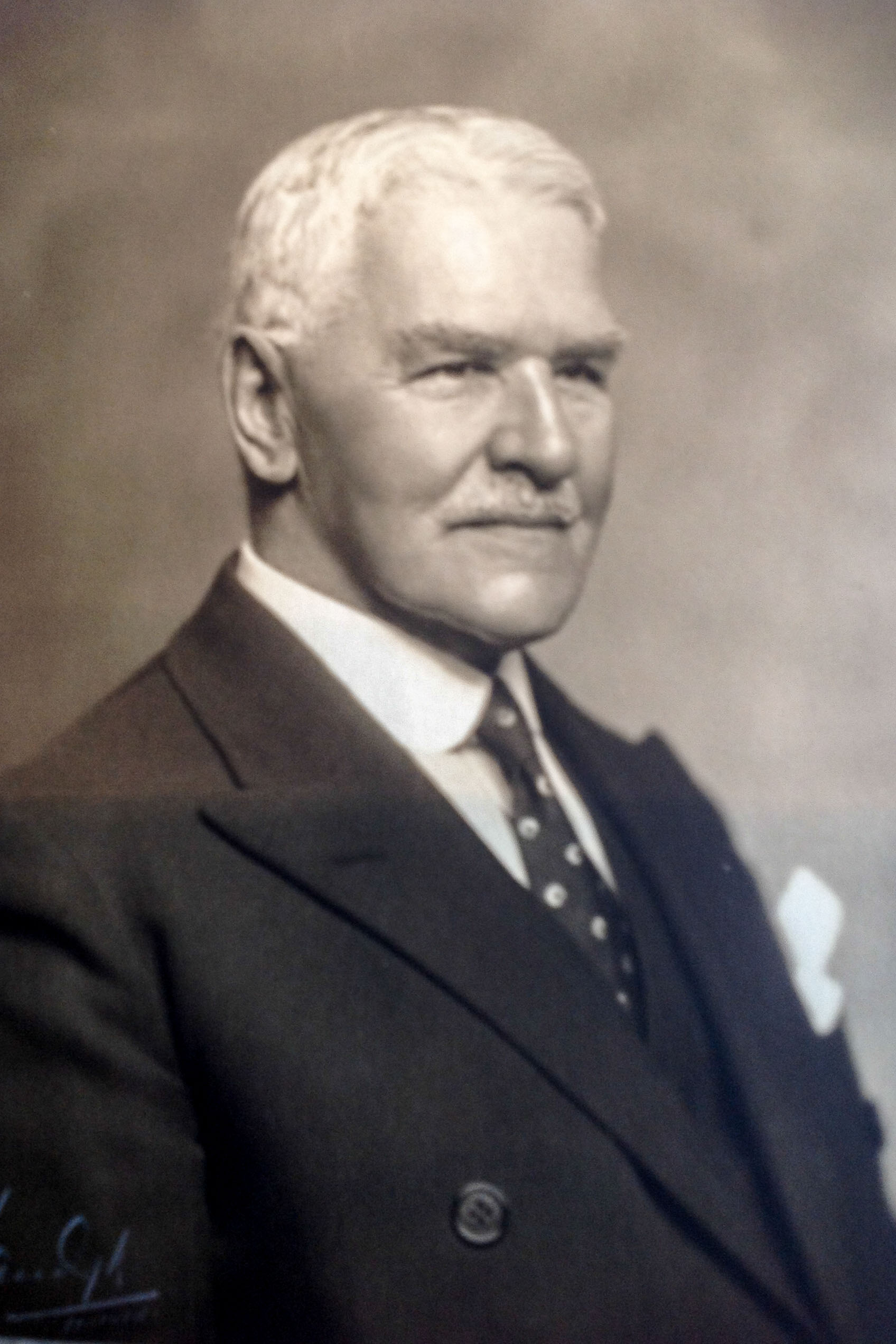
Mining pioneer John Henry Cordner-James

== Life and career ==
Born in 1857 as John Henry James, the son of Abraham Trewantha James & Johanna Grey, he changed his name by adding Cordner, ostensibly to differentiate himself from siblings William James and Alfred James in his family firm, James Bros.

He developed a prolific career as a gold mining engineer and consultant, travelling extensively to Russia, Australia, South America and South Africa, and was one of the first owners of a motor car in England. In South Africa, Cordner-James notably formed the Gold Recovery Syndicate to acquire the patent rights to practice the MacArthur-Forrest gold cyanidation mining process in 1922. In Australia he had various business interests with fellow director of the Oroya-Brownhill mining company, future US President Herbert Hoover. In 1912 he was elected to the position of Vice President of the English Council of the Institution of Mining and Metallurgy.

At the outbreak of World War One, he purchased future Beatles recording studio Abbey Road Studios, London, which he retained until 1929.

Cordner-James suffered from arthritis towards the end of his life and in 1934 at the age of 76 built a new home near Aldeburgh, Suffolk, on account of its private location and low rainfall, which he lived in until his death in 1946.
