= Joseph Gurney Barclay (astronomer) =

- Born: 1816
- Died: 1898 (aged 81–82)
- Occupations: Banker astronomer
- Spouses: Mary Walker Leatham; Margaret Exton

Joseph Gurney Barclay FRAS (1816 – 25 April 1898) was the son of Robert and Elizabeth Barclay (née Gurney). Joseph Gurney Barclay followed the banking profession for more than fifty years. In his later career he was head of the Barclay & Bevan bank and retired at the age of 80 when his bank amalgamated with others into a limited company in 1896, becoming Barclays. He was also a life member of the Meteorological Society.

== Biography ==
Barclay was a banker by profession and an amateur astronomer.

=== Early life ===
About the time of Barclay's birth, his grandfather, who owned an estate in Clapham, South West London, died and Robert Barclay moved his family to Knotts Green, Leyton, East London.

=== Astronomical Work ===
Barclay built an observatory in the grounds of Knotts Green in 1862. The observatory, which was located at 51° 34' 34" N latitude and 0^{h} 0.87^{m} W longitude (equivalent to just under 0.22°), was equipped with a 7 1/4-inch (184mm) aperture equatorial telescope made by Thomas Cooke & Sons of York in 1854. The telescope was exchanged for a 10-inch (254mm) aperture 12 feet (3.66m) focal length instrument in 1860 by the same maker, which was fitted with a three-inch (76mm) aperture finder telescope. The observatory was also equipped with a transit telescope by Troughton & Simms for time determination. The acquisition of the second, larger, telescope persuaded Barclay that it would be necessary to have a professional astronomer to work the observatory for him, and the services of Hermann Romberg (1835–1898) were obtained. In 1864, after only two years work, Romberg moved to the Berlin Observatory and was replaced by Charles George Talmage (1840–1886). Talmage suffered from poor health and his death in his mid-forties in 1886 brought an end to regular observational work at Leyton. Barclay died just two years after Talmage and the telescope was bequeathed to the Radcliffe Observatory in Oxford. The transit telescope was separately bequeathed to the Oxford University Observatory. When the Radcliffe left the UK for the better skies of Southern Africa in the nineteen-thirties the Cooke telescope stayed in behind and was installed at Marlborough College Observatory.

=== Marriage and children ===
Barclay married twice, first to Mary Walker Leatham and second to Margaret Exton. With his first wife he had two sons and one daughter., the second marriage producing Edward Exton Barclay, Francis Hubert Barclay, and Henry Albert Barclay CVO.

=== Religion ===
Barclay was a member of the Religious Society of Friends.

== Published works ==
Leyton Observations (4 volumes).

== Honours, decorations, awards and distinctions ==
Fellow of the Royal Astronomical Society from 1855.
