= Maurice Codner =

British portrait painter

Maurice Frederick Codner (27 September 1888 – 10 March 1958) was a British portrait painter. His portraits include those of Athene Seyler (1933), Evelyn Laye (1933), Sir George Robey (1935), Jean Batten (c.1935), Sir George Broadbridge (1937), Alderman Mrs Sarah Jane Bannister (1939), Lord Alexander of Tunis (1946), Kathleen Ferrier (1946), King George VI (1951), Queen Elizabeth the Queen Mother (1952), Leslie Henson (1952), Gwilym Lloyd-George (1955) and Sir Albert Richardson (1956).
