= Puckeridge Hunt =

The Puckeridge Hunt is a foxhound pack in East Anglia.

== Country ==
The country covers some 19 miles (31 km) north to south and 22 miles (35 km) east to west in the counties of Hertfordshire, Essex and Cambridgeshire. The country is one of bank and ditch, arable and grasslands. Adjoining hunts are to the north the Thurlow Hunt, to the east and south-east the Essex Hunt and to the north and south the Cambridgeshire Hunt and Enfield Chase.

== History ==
The Hunt dates back to 1725 when hounds were kept at Cheshunt and the country was also that of the Hertfordshire. The country, as now constituted, has existed since 1799. In 1970 the Puckeridge amalgamated with the Newmarket and Thurlow to form the Puckeridge & Thurlow Hunt, but in 1992 this union was dissolved and the re-established Puckeridge reverted to its old boundaries. The Mastership has been in the Barclay family continuously for over a hundred seasons. The breeding of all the hounds can be traced back to 1725 through the Stud Book.

=== HMS Puckeridge ===
HMS Puckeridge was one of 33, Type II Hunt Escort Destroyers named after fox hunts located in different parts of Britain.

On 8 September 2003, a 60th Anniversary Commemoration Service was held in the village of Puckeridge to honour members of the ship’s company who lost their lives while serving aboard. This was attended by five survivors, members of the Royal Naval Association, British Legion and the Puckeridge and Standon community.
