= Nick Rosen (British filmmaker) =

Nick Rosen is an author, campaigner and documentary film-maker. His book Off the Grid: Inside the Movement for More Space, Less Government, and True Independence in Modern America is published by Penguin Books and was released July 27, 2010.

His book How To Live Off-Grid, published by Doubleday June 2007, is a guide to escaping the rat race; part of an ecological campaign to change the rules on planning permission via his website Off-Grid.net started in 1996.

== Books ==
- The Net-Head Handbook: The First Guide to Computer Chic (Hodder & Stoughton, 1996).

== Films ==
- Brezhnev's Daughter (awarded Best International Production at the New York Film and TV Festival, 1995).
- Sacred Ground (co-production between Vivum, PBS Frontline and Channel 4).
- The Battle for Ground Zero (Channel 4; also shown on PBS Frontline).

== Publications ==
- Co-author, The Internet 1995–2000 (Durlacher Stockbrokers, published 1996).
- business.eu (published 2000).

In the early nineties, Nick became a freelance journalist, primarily writing for The Times and The Guardian. It was during this period that he met Katharine Hamnett and co-founded the short lived eco magazine TOMORROW.

In 1992, Rosen formed a TV production company, Vivum, and began to make documentaries for the ITV First Tuesday series. In 1992-3 he produced Brezhnev's Daughter, a documentary about the way the Nomenklatura were coming to terms with the new order in Russia. It won Best International Production prize at the NY Film and TV Festival.

Rosen wrote "The Durlacher Report" which became the base document in many of the early Internet IPOs, such as Demon, Pipex and Easynet, and followed this with The Net-Head Handbook, a satire about the dawning of the internet.

In 2004, Rosen produced Sacred Ground, the fight for Ground Zero, for PBS and Channel 4 – a film about the battle to build a meaningful memorial at Ground Zero, and in 2006 he produced Britain’s Commuter Nightmare, a one-hour documentary for Channel 4 Dispatches.

His other ventures as start-ups included The Online Research Agency Limited which in its short life produced one considerable work "Business.eu" - a report focused on online business in Europe. Online Research Agency was wound up in an orderly manner in 2001, shortly after Rosen had sold the domain name 'itv.com' to the ITV company Granada for approximately £100,000; he had registered it to himself back in 1994. In 2000, Rosen had been taken to the WIPO domain tribunal by another media company, XFM radio, after Rosen had registered the domain name 'xfm.com' in 1996 via his company Intervid Limited; the panel concluded that "the onus lies on the complainant...it is felt that it has not done quite enough to shift that onus. In view of the above, the claim for relief is denied." In autumn 1995, the International Times editor and publisher, Chris Brook, threatened legal proceedings via David Wineman solicitors over another domain name issue; Rosen then claimed a 'mistake' had been made and the issue was settled.

In 1999 he met his wife, artist Fiona Banner. They married in 2005 and have a young daughter.

He is the son of scientist Dennis Rosen.
