= Jacques Raverat =

French painter

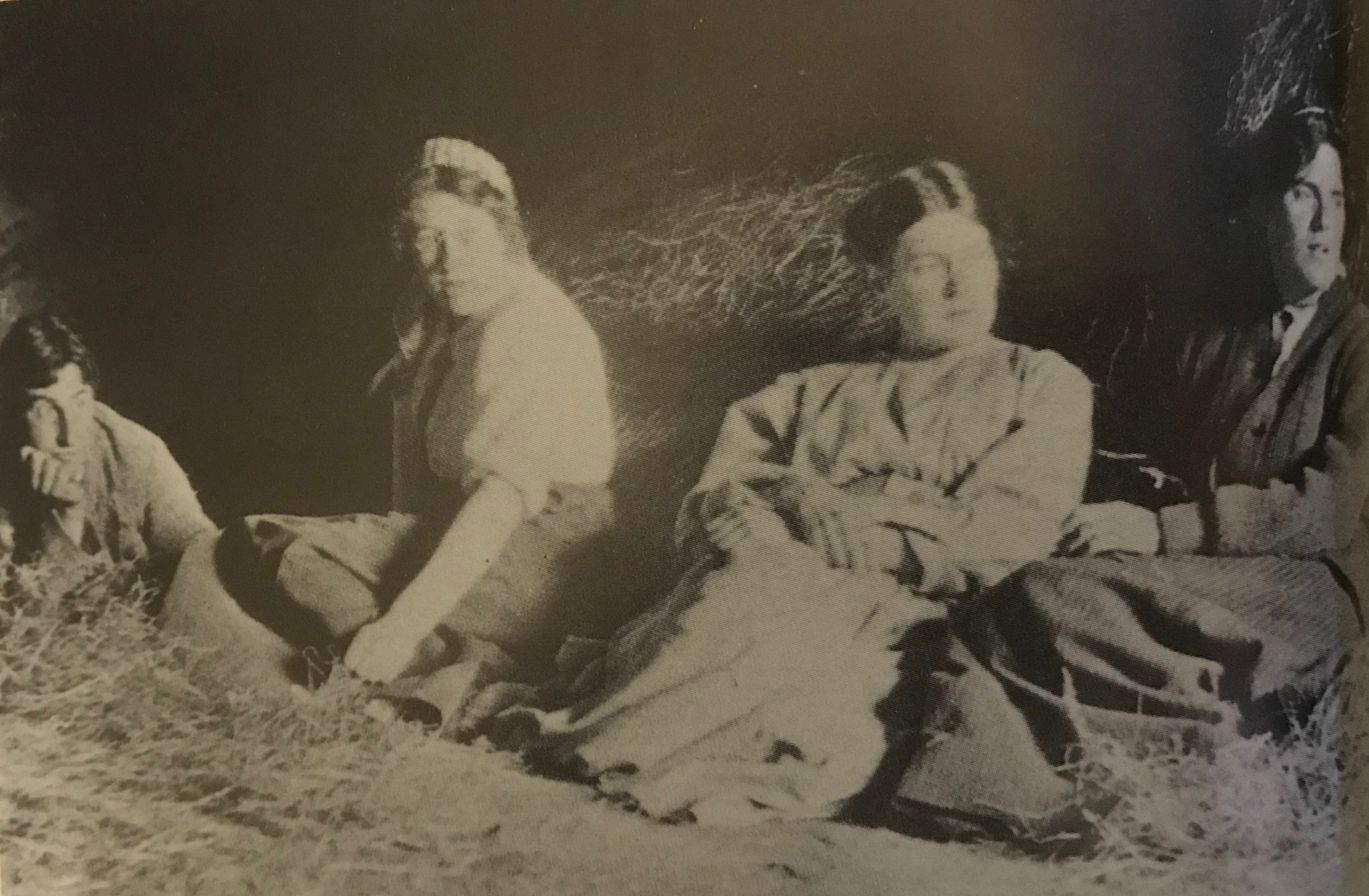
Jacques Raverat, Ka Cox, Gwen Raverat and Frances Cornford in a Norfolk barn

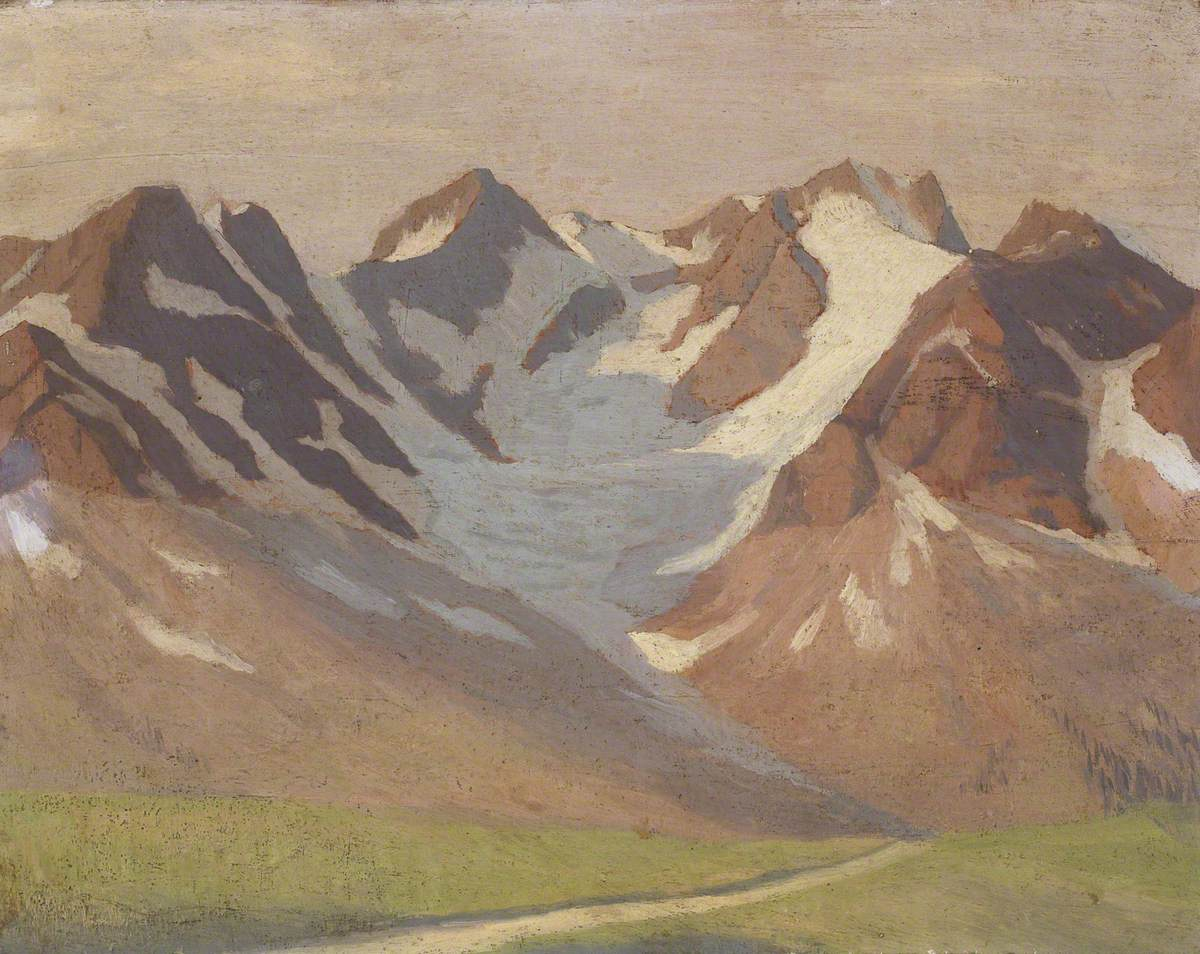
Jacques Raverat (1885–1925) - Mountains in the Dauphiné - PD.4-2010 - Fitzwilliam Museum

Jacques Pierre Paul Raverat (pronounced Rav-er-ah) (20 March 1885 – 6 March 1925) was a French painter; Raverat was the son of Georges Pierre Raverat and Helena Lorena Raverat, née Caron; he was born in Paris, France, in 1885.

Raverat started at Bedales School in Steep, Hampshire in 1898. From Bedales, he went up to Jesus College, Cambridge.

He married the English painter and wood engraver Gwen Darwin, in 1911, the daughter of George Darwin and Lady Maud Darwin, née Maud du Puy; she was a granddaughter of Charles Darwin. They had two daughters, Elisabeth (1916–2014), who married the Norwegian politician Edvard Hambro, and Sophie Jane (1919–2011) who married the Cambridge scholar M. G. M. Pryor and later Charles Gurney. Raverat suffered from a form of multiple sclerosis and died on 6 March 1925, following complications of it. His funeral took place in Christ Church in Cannes, France, where he may be buried.

Before moving, in 1920, to Vence in France the couple were active members of an intellectual circle known as the "Neo-Pagans" and centred on Rupert Brooke. They also moved on the fringes of the Bloomsbury Group, whose members included Virginia Woolf, John Maynard Keynes, Vanessa Bell and Lytton Strachey.

In 2004, his grandson, William Pryor edited the complete correspondence between Raverat, his wife and Virginia Woolf which was published as Virginia Woolf and the Raverats.

== See also ==
- List of Bloomsbury Group people
