= List of English Heritage blue plaques in London =

This is a list of the 1018 blue plaques placed by English Heritage and its predecessors in the boroughs of London, the City of Westminster, and the City of London. The scheme includes a small number of plaques that were erected privately and subsequently absorbed.

The scheme began in 1866. It was originally administered by the Royal Society of Arts until 1901 when it was taken over the London County Council. The LCC ran the scheme until its abolition in 1965 when its successor body the Greater London Council (GLC) took charge. Since the abolition of the GLC in 1986, the blue plaque scheme has been administered by English Heritage.

== By borough ==
=== Barking and Dagenham ===
There is a single blue plaque in the London Borough of Barking and Dagenham.

Subject	Inscription	Location	Year installed	Photo	Open Plaques ref	Notes
Bobby Moore 1941–1993	"Captain of the World Cup-winning England Football Team lived here"	43 Waverley Gardens; Barking IG11 0BH	2016		41578	

=== Barnet ===
There are 19 blue plaques in the London Borough of Barnet.

Subject	Inscription	Location	Year installed	Photo	Open Plaques ref	Notes
Harold Abrahams (1899–1978)	"Olympic athlete lived here"	Hodford Lodge, 2 Hodford Road; Golders Green NW11 8NP; 51.566°N 0.196745°W	2007		437	
William Blake and John Linnell (1757–1827) (1792–1882)	"John Linnell 1792–1882 Painter, lived here William Blake 1757–1827 Poet and Artist stayed here as his guest"	Old Wyldes', North End; Hampstead NW3 7HS; 51.56898°N 0.18187°W	1975		521	
Sir William Bowman (1816-1892)	"Ophthalmic surgeon and anatomist lived here"	St Anthony’s School, Ivy House, 94-96 North End Road; Golders Green NW11 7SX; 51.56862°N 0.18479°W	2019		52363	
Wing Commander J.R.D. 'Bob' Braham (1920-1974)	"RAF Fighter Pilot lived here as a boy"	139 Hendon Way; Childs Hill NW4 2PX; 51.56814°N 0.20739°W	2017		43812	
Herbert Chapman (1878–1934)	"Football Manager lived and died here"	6 Haslemere Avenue; Hendon NW4 2PX; 51.57911°N 0.21610°W	2005		483	
Robert Donat (1905–1958)	"Actor lived here"	8 Meadway; Hampstead Garden Suburb NW11 7JT; 51.57842°N 0.19031°W	1994		684	
Abram Games (1914-1996)	"Poster artist and designer lived and worked here 1948-1996"	41 The Vale; Golders Green, Barnet NW11 8SE; 51.56889°N 0.20263°W	2019		51445	
Henry Hall (1898–1989)	"Dance Band Leader and Broadcaster lived here 1932–1959"	38 Harman Drive; Cricklewood NW2 2ED; 51.55891°N 0.20580°W	2003		72	
Dame Myra Hess (1890–1965)	"Pianist lived here"	48 Wildwood Road; Hampstead Garden Suburb NW11 6UP; 51.57630°N 0.18258°W	1987		218	
Graham Hill (1929–1975)	"World Champion Racing Driver lived here 1960–1972"	32 Parkside; Mill Hill NW7 2LH; 51.60966°N 0.23914°W	2003		324	
Amy Johnson (1903–1941)	"Aviator lived here"	Vernon Court, Hendon Way; Cricklewood NW2 2PE; 51.55926°N 0.19850°W	1987		7315	
Mary Macarthur (1880–1921)	"Trade Unionist and campaigner for working women lived and died here"	42 Woodstock Road; Golders Green NW11 8ER; 51.572325°N 0.200107°W	2017		42502	
Frank Pick (1878–1941)	"Pioneer of Good Design for London Transport lived here"	15 Wildwood Road; Golders Green NW11 6UP; 51.57766°N 0.18198°W	1981		282	
Sir Karl Popper (1902–1994)	"Philosopher lived here 1946–1950"	16 Burlington Rise; Oakleigh Park EN4 8NN; 51.63527°N 0.15927°W	2008		9680	
Juan Pujol Garcia (1912–1988)	"Secret Agent codename 'Garbo' lived and worked here	35 Crespigny Road, Hendon NW4 3DU; 51.58074°N 0.22972°W	2020		51766	
Little Tich (Harry Relph) (1867–1928)	"Music Hall Comedian lived and died here"	93 Shirehall Park; Hendon NW4 2QU; 51.57806°N 0.21585°W	1969		115	
Sir Ralph Richardson (1902–1983)	"Actor lived here 1944–1968"	Bedegar's Lea, Kenwood Close; Hampstead Garden Suburb NW3 7JL; 51.57079°N 0.17415°W	2009		266	
Thomas Smith Tait (1882–1954)	"Architect lived here"	Gates House, Wyldes Close; Hampstead NW11 7JB; 51.56953°N 0.18158°W	2006		10421	
Evelyn Waugh (1903–1966)	"Writer lived here"	145 North End Road; Golders Green NW11 7HT; 51.56954°N 0.18616°W	1993		702	

=== Bexley ===
There are two blue plaques in the London Borough of Bexley.

Subject	Inscription	Location	Year installed	Photo	Open Plaques ref	Notes
William Morris; Philip Webb; (1834–1896); (1831–1915)	"Red House built in 1859–1860 by Philip Webb, architect for William Morris poet and artist who lived here 1860–1865"	Red House, Red House Lane; Bexleyheath DA6 8JF	1969		433	
Robert Stewart, Viscount Castlereagh (1769–1822)	"Statesman"	Loring Hall, 8 Water Lane, North Cray; Sidcup DA14 5ES	1989		292	

=== Brent ===
There are three blue plaques in the London Borough of Brent.

Subject	Inscription	Location	Year installed	Photo	Open Plaques ref	Notes
Tommy Flowers 1905–1998	"The former Post Office Research Station where Tommy Flowers (1905–1998) designed and built the pioneering Colossus computer"	Chartwell Court, 151 Brook Road, Dollis Hill NW2 7DW	2023		59262	
Sir Hersch Lauterpacht 1897–1960	"An architect of modern international law and human rights lived here"	103 Walm Lane; Cricklewood NW2 4QG	2022		57533	
Arthur Lucan (Arthur Trowle) 1887–1954 (see notes)	"Entertainer and creator of Old Mother Riley"	11 Forty Lane; Wembley HA9 9EA	1978		421	The birth date listed on the plaque is incorrect, as Lucan was born in 1885.

=== Bromley ===
There are seven blue plaques in the London Borough of Bromley.

Person	Inscription	Address	Year issued	Photo
Ira Aldridge (1807–1867)	"Shakespearian Actor 'The African Roscius' lived here"	5 Hamlet Road; Upper Norwood SE19 2AP	2007	
W. G. Grace (1848–1915)	"Cricketer lived here"	Fairmount, Mottingham Lane; Mottingham SE9 9AG	1963	
Prince Peter Kropotkin (1842–1921)	"Theorist of Anarchism lived here"	6 Crescent Road; Sundridge Park BR1 3PW	1989	
Alexander Muirhead (1848–1920)	"Electrical Engineer lived here"	20 Church Road; Shortlands BR2 0HP	1981	
Rachel McMillan (1859–1917); Margaret McMillan (1860–1931)	"Pioneers of Nursery Education lodged here"	51 Tweedy Road; Bromley BR1 3NH	2009	
Dadabhai Naoroji (1825–1917)	"Indian nationalist and MP lived here"	72 Anerley Park; Penge SE20 8NQ	2022	
Marie Stopes (1880–1958)	"Promoter of sex education and birth control lived here 1880–1892"	28 Cintra Park; Upper Norwood SE19 2LH	2010	

=== Camden ===
There are 183 blue plaques in the London Borough of Camden.

=== Croydon ===
There are twelve blue plaques in the London Borough of Croydon.

Person	Inscription	Address	Year issued	Photo
Dame Peggy Ashcroft (1907–1991)	"Actress was born here"	1A Tirlemont Road; South Croydon CR2 6DS	2024	
Raymond Chandler (1888–1959)	"Writer Lived Here"	110 Auckland Road; Upper Norwood SE19 2BY	2014	
Samuel Coleridge-Taylor (1875–1912)	"Composer of the 'Song of Hiawatha' lived here"	30 Dagnall Park; South Norwood SE25 5PH	1975	
Sir Arthur Conan Doyle (1859–1930)	"Creator of Sherlock Holmes lived here 1891–1894"	12 Tennison Road; South Norwood SE25 5RT	1973	
Frederick George Creed (1871–1957)	"Electrical Engineer Inventor of the Teleprinter lived and died here"	20 Outram Road; Addiscombe CR0 6XE	1973	
Peter Cushing (1913–1994)	"Actor lived here"	32 St James' Road; Purley CR8 2DL	2018	
C. B. Fry (1872–1956)	"All-round Sportsman was born here"	144 St James's Road; Croydon CR0 2UY	2005	
Will Hay (1888–1949)	"Comic Actor and Astronomer lived here 1927–1934"	45 The Chase; Norbury SW16 3AE	2000	
John Horniman (1803–1893); Frederick John Horniman (1835–1906)	"Tea Merchants, Collectors and Public Benefactors lived here"	Coombe Cliff, Coombe Road; Croydon CR0 5SP	1988	
W. F. R. Stanley (1829–1909)	"Inventor, Manufacturer and Philanthropist founded and designed these halls and technical school"	Stanley Halls, 12 South Norwood Hill; South Norwood SE25 6AB	1993	
Alfred Russel Wallace (1823–1913)	"Naturalist lived here"	44 St Peter's Road; South Croydon CR0 1RG	1979	
Emile Zola (1840–1902)	"French Novelist lived here 1898–1899"	Queen's Hotel, 122 Church Road; Upper Norwood SE19 2UG	1990	

=== Ealing ===
There are eight blue plaques in the London Borough of Ealing.

Person	Inscription	Address	Year issued	Photo
Sir Michael Balcon (1896–1977)	"Film Producer worked here 1938–1956"	Ealing Studios, Ealing Green; Ealing W5 5EP	2005	
Alan Dower Blumlein (1903–1942)	"Electronics Engineer and Inventor lived here"	37 The Ridings, Hanger Hill; Ealing W5 3BT	1977	
Dorothea Lambert Chambers (1878–1960)	"Lawn Tennis Champion lived here 1887–1907"	7 North Common Road; Ealing W5 2QB	2005	
John Conolly (1794–1866)	"The former Hanwell Asylum where Dr John Conolly 1794–1866 promoted the humane treatment of mental illness from 1839"	C Block, St Bernard's Hospital, Uxbridge Road, Southall, London, UB1 3EUJ	2022	
John Lindley (1799–1865)	"Botanist and Pioneer Orchidologist lived here from 1836 and died here"	Bedford House, The Avenue; Acton Green W4 2PJ	2005	
Fred Perry (1909–1995)	"Tennis Champion lived here 1919–1935"	223 Pitshanger Lane, Brentham Garden Estate; Ealing W5 1RG	2012	
Odette Sansom GC (1912–1995)	"SOE agent in occupied France lived here"	6 Lawrence Road, South Ealing, W5 4XH	2025	
Richard Titmuss (1907–1973)	"Social Scientist lived here 1951–1973"	32 Twyford Avenue; Acton W3 9QB	2011	

=== Enfield ===
There are four blue plaques in the London Borough of Enfield.

Subject	Inscription	Location	Year installed	Photo	Open Plaques ref	Notes
Charles Coward (1905–1976)	"Rescuer of Prisoners from Auschwitz lived here 1945–1976"	133 Chichester Road; Edmonton N9 9DF	2003		6494	
Charles Lamb; Mary Lamb; (1775–1834); (1764–1847)	"Writers lived here"	Lamb's Cottage, Church Street; Edmonton N9 9DY	1999		479	
Stevie Smith (1902–1971)	"Poet lived here 1906–1971"	1 Avondale Road; Palmers Green N13 4DX	2005		275	
Joseph Whitaker (1820–1895)	"Publisher Founder of Whitaker's Almanack lived and died here"	White Lodge, 68 Silver Street; Enfield EN1 3EW	1998		14	

=== Greenwich ===
There are 16 blue plaques in the Royal Borough of Greenwich.

Person or institution	Inscription	Address	Year issued	Photo
William Henry Barlow (1812–1902)	"Engineer lived and died here"	145 Charlton Road; Charlton SE7 7EZ	1991	
Cecil Day-Lewis (1904–1972)	"Poet Laureate lived here 1957–1972"	6 Croom's Hill; Greenwich SE10 8HL	1998	
Sir Frank Dyson (1868–1939)	"Astronomer Royal lived here 1894–1906"	6 Vanbrugh Hill; Blackheath SE3 7UF	1990	
Sir Arthur Eddington O. M. (1882–1944)	"Mathematician and Astrophysicist lived here"	4 Bennett Park; Blackheath SE3 9RB	1974	
GPO Film Unit	"GPO Film Unit later Crown Film Unit; pioneers of documentary film making had their studios here"	47 Bennett Park; Blackheath SE3 9RA	2000	
Charles Gounod (1813–1893)	"Composer stayed here in 1870"	15 Morden Road; Blackheath SE3 0AA	1961	
Nathaniel Hawthorne (1804–1864)	"American author stayed here in 1856"	4 Pond Road; Blackheath SE3 9JL	1953	
Richard Jefferies (1848–1887)	"Naturalist and Writer lived here"	59 Footscray Road; Eltham SE9 2ST	1986	
William Lindley; 1808–1900; Sir William Heerlein Lindley; 1853–1917	"Civil Engineers lived here"	74 Shooters Hill; Blackheath SE3 7BG	2015	
Herbert Morrison, Baron Morrison of Lambeth (1888–1965)	"Cabinet Minister and Leader of the London County Council lived here 1929–1960"	55 Archery Road; Eltham SE9 1HF	1977	
Donald McGill (1875–1962)	"Postcard Cartoonist lived here"	5 Bennett Park; Blackheath SE3 9RA	1977	
Philip Stanhope, 4th Earl of Chesterfield (1694–1773)	"Statesman and author Lived here"	Ranger's House, Chesterfield Walk; Blackheath SE10 8QX	1937	
Italo Svevo (1861–1928)	"Ettore Schmitz alias Italo Svevo 1861–1928 Writer lived here 1903–1913"	67 Charlton Church Lane; Charlton SE7 7AB	1999	
Benjamin Waugh (1839–1908)	"Founder of the NSPCC lived here"	26 Croom's Hill; Greenwich SE10 8ER	1984	
General James Wolfe (1727–1759)	"Victor of Quebec lived here"	Macartney House; Greenwich Park SE10 8HJ	1909	
Garnet Wolseley, 1st Viscount Wolseley (1833–1913)	"Field-Marshal Lived here"	Ranger's House, Chesterfield Walk; Blackheath SE10 8QX	1937	

=== Hackney ===
There are eight blue plaques in the London Borough of Hackney.

Person or institution	Inscription	Address	Year issued	Photo
The Ayahs' Home	"The AYAHS' HOME for nannies and nursemaids from Asia was based here 1900–1921"	26 King Edward's Road, Hackney, E9 7SF	2022	
Daniel Defoe (1661–1731)	"Lived in a house on this site"	95 Stoke Newington Church Street; Stoke Newington N16 0AS	1932	
Maria Dickin (1870–1951)	"Promoter of animal welfare and founder of PDSA was born here"	41 Cassland Road; Hackney E9 7AL	2015	
Philip Henry Gosse (1810–1888) and Sir Edmund Gosse (1849–1928)	"Here lived Philip Henry Gosse 1810–1888 Zoologist Sir Edmund Gosse 1849–1928 Writer and Critic born here"	56 Mortimer Road; De Beauvoir Town N1 5AP	1983	
Ebenezer Howard (1850–1928)	"Pioneer of the Garden city movement lived here"	50 Durley Road; Stamford Hill N16 6JS	1991	
Marie Lloyd (1870–1922)	"Music hall Artiste lived here"	55 Graham Road; Hackney E8 1PB	1977	
Joseph Priestley (1733–1804)	"Scientist, Philosopher and Theologian was Minister to the Gravel Pit Meeting here in 1793–1794"	7–8 Ram Place; Hackney E9 6LT	1985	
Curtain Theatre	"The site of this building forms part of what was once the precinct of the priory of St. John the Baptist, Holywell, within a few yards stood from 1577 to 1598, the first London building specially devoted to the performance of plays, and known as "The Theatre"	86–88 Curtain Road; Shoreditch EC2A 3AA	1920	

=== Hammersmith and Fulham ===
There are 27 blue plaques in the London Borough of Hammersmith and Fulham.

Subject	Inscription	Location	Year installed	Photo	Open Plaques ref	Notes
Sri Aurobindo (1872–1950)	"Indian Spiritual Leader lived here 1884–1887"	49 St Stephen's Avenue; Shepherd's Bush W12 8JB	2007		280	
Sir Frank Brangwyn (1867–1956)	"Artist lived here"	Temple Lodge, 51 Queen Caroline Street; Hammersmith W6 9QL	1989		144	
Christina Broom 1862–1939	"Photographer lived and worked here from 1913"	92 Munster Road; Fulham, SW6 5RD	2024		64983	
Thomas James Cobden-Sanderson (1840–1922)	"Founded the Doves Bindery and Doves Press in this house and later lived and died here"	15 Upper Mall; Chiswick W6 9TA	1974		707	
Samuel Taylor Coleridge (1772–1834)	"Poet and philosopher lived here"	7 Addison Bridge Place; West Kensington W14 8XP	1950		255	
Ellen Craft (c.1829–c.1891) William Craft (c.1824-1900)	"Refugees from slavery and campaigners for its abolition lived here"	26 Cambridge Grove; Hammersmith W6 0LA	2021		55896	
Emily Wilding Davison (1872–1913)	"Teacher and Suffragette lived here"	43 Fairholme Road; West Kensington W14 9JZ	2023		58727	
Sir Geoffrey De Havilland (1882–1965)	"Aircraft designer lived here 1909–1910"	32 Baron's Court Road; Barons Court W14 9DT	2001		626	
Ouida (1839–1908)	"Novelist lived here"	11 Ravenscourt Square; Hammersmith W6 0TW	1952		583	
George Devine (1910–1966)	"Actor Artistic Director of the Royal Court Theatre 1956–1965 lived here"	9 Lower Mall; Chiswick W6 9DJ	1992		253	
Sir Edward Elgar (1857–1934)	"Composer lived here 1890–1891"	51 Avonmore Road; West Kensington W14 8RT	1962		100	
Mahatma Gandhi (1869–1948)	"Lived here as a law student"	20 Baron's Court Road; Barons Court W14 9DT	1986		480	
Marcus Garvey (1887–1940)	"Pan-Africanist Leader lived and died here"	53 Talgarth Road; Barons Court W14 9DD	2005		193	
Sir Eugene Goossens 1893–1962)	"This was the home of the Goossens family of musicians 1912–1927"	70 Edith Road; West Kensington W14 9AR	1999		1288	
Sir Henry Rider Haggard (1856–1925)	"Novelist lived here 1885–1888"	69 Gunterstone Road; West Kensington W14 9BS	1977		312	
Sir Alan Herbert (1890–1971)	"Author, Humourist and reformist M.P. lived and died here"	12 Hammersmith Terrace; Chiswick W6 9TS	1993		116	
Gustav Holst (1874–1934)	"Composer wrote The Planets and taught here"	St Paul's Girls' School; Brook Green W6 7BS	2004		688	
Edward Johnston (1872–1944)	"Master Calligrapher lived here 1905–1912"	3 Hammersmith Terrace; Chiswick W6 9TS	1977		1854	
Harold Laski (1893–1950)	"Teacher and political philosopher lived here 1926–1950"	5 Addison Bridge Place; West Kensington W14 8XP	1974		523	
Sir Joseph Lyons (1847–1917)	"Pioneer of mass catering lived here"	11a Palace Mansions, Earsby Street; West Kensington W14 8QN	2016		42078	
John Osborne (1929–1994)	"Playwright lived here in a ground floor flat 1951–1955"	53 Caithness Road; Hammersmith W14 0JD	2021		55088	
Eric Ravilious (1903–1942)	"Artist lived here 1931–1935"	48 Upper Mall; Chiswick W6 9TA	1991		335	
Sir Frank Short (1857–1945)	"Engraver and painter lived here"	56 Brook Green; Brook Green W6 7BJ	1951		518	
Sir John Tenniel (1820–1914)	"Artist and Cartoonist, lived here."	52 Fitz-George Avenue; West Kensington W14 0SW	2025		78599	First erected by London County Council at 10 Portsdown Road, Maida Vale, City of Westminster on 12th March 1930. Street renamed Randolph Avenue in 1939. House demolished and plaque stored 1959. Plaque restored and rehung at West Kensington address 13th November 2025
Silver Studio Arthur Silver (1853–1896) Harry Silver (1881–1971) Rex Silver (1879–1965)	"The Silver Studio established here. Designers lived here."	84 Brook Green Road; Brook Green W6 7BS	1981		547	
Sir Emery Walker (1851–1933)	"Typographer and antiquary lived here 1903–1933"	Emery Walker house, 7 Hammersmith Terrace; Chiswick W6 9TS	1959		623	
Christopher Whitworth Whall (1849–1924)	"Stained Glass Artist lived here"	19 Ravenscourt Road; Hammersmith W6 0UH	1983		428	

=== Haringey ===
There are eleven blue plaques in the London Borough of Haringey.

Person or institution	Inscription	Address	Year issued	Photo
Laurie Cunningham (1956–1989)	"England International Footballer lived here"	73 Lancaster Road; Stroud Green N4 4PL	2016	
A. V. Hill (1886–1977)	"Physiologist lived here 1923–1967"	16 Bishopswood Road; Highgate N6 4NY	2015	
A. E. Housman (1859–1936)	"Poet and scholar wrote "A Shropshire Lad" while living here"	17 North Road; Highgate N6 4BD	1969	
Luke Howard (1772–1864)	"Namer of Clouds lived and died here"	7 Bruce Grove; Tottenham N17 6RA	2002	
BBC Television	"The world's first regular high definition television service was inaugurated here by the BBC 2 November 1936"	Alexandra Palace; Wood Green N22 7AY	1977	
Mary Kingsley (1862–1900)	"Traveller and ethnologist lived here as a child"	22 Southwood Lane; Highgate N6 5EE	1975	
Dame Alicia Markova (1910−2004)	"Prima Ballerina lived here as a child"	7 Cascade Avenue; Muswell Hill N10 3PT	2025	
Frank Matcham (1854–1920)	"Theatre Architect lived here 1895–1904"	10 Haslemere Road; Crouch End N8 9QX	2007	
V. K. Krishna Menon (1896–1974)	"Campaigner for Indian Independence lived here"	30 Langdon Park Road; Highgate N6 5QG	2013	
Vinayak Damodar Savarkar (1883–1966)	"Indian Patriot and Philosopher lived here"	65 Cromwell Avenue; Highgate N6 5HS	1985	
Arthur Waley (1889–1966)	"Poet, Translator and Orientalist lived and died here"	50 Southwood Lane; Highgate N6 9TS	1995	

=== Harrow ===
There are four blue plaques in the London Borough of Harrow.

Subject	Inscription	Location	Year installed	Photo	Open Plaques ref	Notes
R. M. Ballantyne (1825–1894)	"Author of Books for Boys lived here"	Duneaves, Mount Park Road; Harrow HA1 3JS	1979		461	
Sir Ambrose Heal (1872–1959)	"Furniture Designer and Retailer lived here 1901–1917"	The Fives Court, Moss Lane; Pinner HA5 3AG	2013		33138	
W. Heath Robinson (1872–1944)	"Illustrator and comic artist lived here 1913–1918"	75 Moss Lane; Pinner HA5 3AZ	1976		632	
Sir W.S. Gilbert (1836–1911) and Frederick Goodall (1822–1904) and Richard Norman Shaw (1831–1912)	"This house designed by Norman Shaw Architect, for Frederick Goodall Painter was later the home of W.S. Gilbert Writer and librettist"	Grim's Dyke, Old Redding; Harrow Weald HA3 6SH	1976		10161	

=== Havering ===
There are no blue plaques in the London Borough of Havering.

=== Hillingdon ===
There are no blue plaques in the London Borough of Hillingdon.

=== Hounslow ===
There are ten blue plaques in the London Borough of Hounslow.

Subject	Inscription	Location	Year installed	Photo	Open Plaques ref	Notes
Jack Beresford (1899–1977)	"Olympic Rowing Champion lived here 1903–1940"	19 Grove Park Gardens; Chiswick W4 3RY	2005		358	
Tommy Cooper (1921–1984)	"Comedian lived here 1955–1984"	51 Barrowgate Road; Chiswick W4 4QT	2016		41326	
E. M. Forster (1879–1970)	"Novelist lived here"	Arlington Park Mansions, Sutton Lane; Turnham Green W4 4HE	1983		495	The plaque was designed to fit into a narrow space, and is only twelve inches (30.5 cm) in diameter.
Joseph Michael Gandy (1771–1843)	"Architectural Visionary lived here 1833–1838"	58 Grove Park Terrace; Chiswick W4 3QE	2006		219	
Patrick Hamilton (1904–1962)	"Novelist and Playwright lived here"	2 Burlington Gardens; Chiswick W4 4LT	2011		8222	
Private Frederick Hitch V.C. (1856–1913)	"Hero of Rorke's Drift lived and died here"	62 Cranbrook Road; Turnham Green W4 2LJ	2004		612	
Freddie Mercury (1946–1991)	"(Fred Bulsara) Singer and Songwriter lived here"	22 Gladstone Avenue; Feltham TW14 9LL	2016		41802	
Lucien Pissarro (1863–1944)	"Painter, Printer Wood Engraver lived here"	27 Stamford Brook Road; Chiswick W6 0XJ	1976		654	
Alexander Pope (1688–1744)	"Poet lived in this row, Mawson's Buildings 1716–1719"	110 Chiswick Lane South; Chiswick W4 2LR	1996		99	Pope's house is now the Mawson Arms, a Grade II* listed public house.
Johann Zoffany (1733–1810)	"Painter lived here 1790–1810"	65 Strand-on-the-Green; Chiswick W4 3PF	1973		563	

=== Islington ===
There are 19 blue plaques in the London Borough of Islington.

Person or institution	Inscription	Address	Year issued	Photo
William Caslon (1692–1766)	"The Foundry established by William Caslon Typefounder 1692–1766 stood on this site 1737–1909"	21–23 Chiswell Street; Moorgate EC1Y 4SD	1958	
Joseph Chamberlain (1836–1914)	"Lived here"	25 Highbury Place; Highbury N5 1QP	1915	
Caroline Chisholm (1808–1877)	"Philanthropist 'The Emigrants' Friend' lived here"	32 Charlton Place; Islington N1 8AJ	1983	
Collins' Music Hall	"Collins Music Hall was here from 1862 to 1958"	10–11 Islington Green; Islington N1 2XH	1986	
Amelia Edwards (1831–1892)	"Egyptologist and writer lived here"	19 Wharton Street; Islington WC1X 9PT	1926	
Dame Gracie Fields (1898–1979)	"Singer and Entertainer lived here"	72A Upper Street; Islington N1 0NY	2011	
David Gestetner (1854–1939)	"Developer of Office Copying Machinery lived here 1898–1939"	124 Highbury New Park; Highbury N5 2DR	2011	
Joseph Grimaldi (1778–1837)	"Clown lived here 1818–1828"	56 Exmouth Market; Clerkenwell EC1R 4QE	1989	
John Groom (1845–1919)	"Philanthropist who founded workshops for disabled girls nearby lived here"	8 Sekforde Street; Clerkenwell EC1R 0HD	1997	
Edward Irving (1792–1834)	"Founder of the Catholic Apostolic Church lived here"	4 Claremont Square; Islington N1 9LY	1982	
Charles Lamb (1775–1834)	"Essayist Lived Here"	64 Duncan Terrace; Islington N1 8AG	1907	
George Leybourne (1842–1884)	""Champagne Charlie" 1842–1884 Music Hall Comedian lived and died here"	136 Englefield Road; De Beauvoir Town N1 3LQ	2013	
Louis Macneice (1907–1963)	"Poet lived here 1947–1952"	52 Canonbury Park South; Islington N1 2JG	1996	
Enid Marx (1902–1998)	"Pattern designer, illustrator and artist lived and worked here from 1965"	39 Thornhill Road, Barnsbury, London, N1 1JS	2022	
Samuel Phelps (1804–1878)	"Tragedian lived here"	8 Canonbury Square; Islington N1 2AU	1911	
Richard Price (1723–1791)	"In this terrace of 1658 lived Dr RICHARD PRICE 1723–1791 Preacher, philosopher, statistician and radical"	54 Newington Green, Newington Green, Islington, N16 9PX	2023	
Thomas Hosmer Shepherd (1793–1864)	"Artist who portrayed London lived here"	26 Batchelor Street; Islington N1 0EG	1976	
Sir Basil Spence (1907–1976)	"Architect lived and worked here"	1 Canonbury Place; Canonbury N1 2NG	2011	
John Wesley (1703–1791)	"Lived here"	47 City Road; Islington EC1Y 1AU	1926	

=== Kensington and Chelsea ===
There are 195 blue plaques in the Royal Borough of Kensington and Chelsea.

=== Kingston upon Thames ===
There are six blue plaques in the Royal Borough of Kingston upon Thames.

Subject	Inscription	Location	Year installed	Photo	Open Plaques ref	Notes
Alfred Bestall (1892–1986)	"Illustrator of Rupert Bear lived here 1936-1966"	58 Cranes Park; Surbiton KT5 8AS	2006		41	
Enid Blyton (1897–1968)	"Children's Writer lived here 1920-1924"	207 Hook Road; Chessington KT9 1EA	2007		353	
Sir Malcolm Campbell and Donald Campbell (1885–1948), (1921–1967)	"Speed Record Holders on Land and Water lived here"	Canbury School, Kingston Hill; Kingston upon Thames KT2 7LN	2010		4872	
The former works of the Cooper Car Company	"Winners of the Formula One World Championships in 1959 and 1960"	Hollyfield Road; Surbiton KT5 9AL	2018		50049	
Dame Nelly Melba (1861–1931)	"Operatic soprano resided here in 1906"	Coombe House, Devey Close, (off Beverley Lane); Coombe KT2 7DT	2000		10034	
C. H. Middleton ‘Mr Middleton’ (1886–1945)	"Gardener and Broadcaster lived here 1928–1945"	17 Princes Avenue; Tolworth KT6 7JJ	2025		77920	

=== Lambeth ===
There are 33 blue plaques in the London Borough of Lambeth.

Subject	Inscription	Location	Year installed	Photo	Open Plaques ref	Notes
Dusé Mohamed Ali (1866–1945)	"Journalist and Pan-Africanist lived in Flat 55"	55 Victoria Mansions, South Lambeth Road; Vauxhall SW8 1QU	2026		83362	
Sir Charles Barry (1795–1860)	"Architect lived and died here"	The Elms, 29 Clapham Common Northside; Clapham SW4 0RW	1950		121	
Sir Arnold Bax (1883–1953)	"Composer was born here"	13 Pendennis Road; Streatham SW16 2SS	1993		438	
Lilian Baylis (1874–1937)	"Manager of the Old Vic and Sadler's Wells Theatres lived and died here"	27 Stockwell Park Road; Stockwell SW9 0AP	1974		321	
John Francis Bentley (1839–1902)	"Architect lived here"	43 Old Town; Clapham SW4 0JL	1950		657	
William Bligh (1754–1817)	"Commander of the "Bounty" lived here"	100 Lambeth Rd; Lambeth SE1 7PT	1952		372	
Angela Carter (1940–1992)	"Writer lived here from 1976"	107 The Chase; Clapham SW4 0NR	2019		52203	
Charlie Chaplin (1889–1977)	"Actor and Film-maker lived here in Flat 15 1908–1910"	15 Glenshaw Mansions, Brixton Road; Kennington SW9 0DS	2017		42876	
Joan Clarke (1917–1996)	"Code-breaker lived here"	193 Rosendale Road; West Dulwich, SE21 8LW	2024		60231	
London County Hall (1922-1986)	"The County Hall the home of London government from 1922 to 1986 LCC 1889–1965 GLC 1965–1986"	London County Hall; South Bank SE1 7PB	1986		1761	
David Cox (1783–1859)	"Artist lived here"	34 Foxley Road; Camberwell SW9 6ES	1951		9907	
Henry Havelock Ellis (1859–1939)	"Pioneer in the scientific study of sex lived here"	14 Dover Mansions, Canterbury Crescent; Brixton SW9 7QF	1981		441	
Graham Greene (1904–1991)	"Writer lived here 1935–1940"	14 Clapham Common Northside; Clapham SW4 0RF	2011		7385	
Sir Phillip Ben Greet (1857–1936)	"Actor-manager lived here"	160 Lambeth Road; Lambeth SE1 7DF	1961		9721	
Edvard Grieg (1843–1907)	"Norwegian Composer stayed here when performing in London"	47 Clapham Common Northside; Clapham SW4 0AA	2004		1133	
Arthur Henderson (1863–1935)	"Statesman lived here"	13 Rodenhurst Road; Clapham SW4 8AE	1980		167	
Sir Jack Hobbs (1882–1963)	"Cricketer lived here"	{{{street_address}}} Clapham SW12 9PA	1986		112	
Inner London Education Authority (1922-1986)	"The home of inner London's education service from 1922 ILEA succeeding the London School Board 1870–1904 and the LCC 1904–1965"	London County Hall; South Bank SE1 7PB	1986		129	
C. L. R. James (1901–1989)	"West Indian Writer and Political Activist lived and died here"	165 Railton Road; Brixton SE24 0JX	2004		485	
Claudia Jones (1915–1964)	"Anti-racist activist and a founding spirit of Notting Hill Carnival lived here"	6 Meadow Road; Vauxhall SW8 1QB	2023		59354	
Dan Leno (1860–1904)	"Music-hall comedian lived here 1898-1901"	56 Akerman Road; Camberwell SW9 6SN	1962		613	
Margaret Lockwood (1916–1990)	"Actress lived here"	14 Highland Road; Upper Norwood SE19 1DP	2018		50750	
Zachary Macaulay and Thomas Babington Macaulay, 1st Baron Macaulay (1768–1838) (1800–1859)	"Zachary Macaulay philanthropist and his son Thomas Babington Macaulay afterwards Lord Macaulay lived here"	5 The Pavement; Clapham SW4 0JD	1930		330	
Dr. Annie McCall (1859–1949)	"The former Clapham Maternity Hospital where Dr Annie McCall 1859–1949 led improvements in maternity care and midwife training"	Marion Court, 68 McCall Close; Stockwell SW4 6PU	2026		93857	the plaque is on the Jeffreys Road elevation of the building
Arthur Mee (1875–1943)	"Journalist, author and topographer lived here"	27 Lanercost Road; Tulse Hill SW2 3DP	1991		9878	
Bernard Montgomery, 1st Viscount Montgomery of Alamein (1887–1976)	"Field Marshal...was born here"	Oval House, 52–54 Kennington; Kennington Oval SE11 5SW	1987		5036	
Olive Morris (1952–1979)	"Anti-racist, feminist and housing rights activist lived here"	121 Railton Road; Brixton SE24 0LR	2024		69009	
John Ruskin (1819–1900)	"Lived in a house on this site"	26 Herne Hill; Herne Hill SE24 9QS	1926		212	
Natsume Sōseki (1867–1916)	"Japanese Novelist lived here 1901–1902"	81 The Chase; Clapham SW4 0NR	2002		147	
Violette Szabo (1921–1945)	"Secret Agent lived here she gave her life for the French Resistance"	18 Burnley Road; Stockwell SW9 0SJ	1981		350	
John Thomson (1837–1921)	"Photographer, geographer and travel writer lived here"	15 Effra Road; Brixton SW2 1BX	1981		64984	
Vincent van Gogh (1853–1890)	"Painter lived here 1873–1874"	87 Hackford Road; South Lambeth SW9 0RE	1973		524	
William Wilberforce (1759–1833)	"William Wilberforce and 'The Clapham Sect' worshipped in this church. Their campaigning resulted in the abolition of slavery in British Dominions, 1833"	Holy Trinity Church, Clapham Common; Clapham SW4 0QZ	1984		698	

=== Lewisham ===
There are thirteen blue plaques in the London Borough of Lewisham.

Subject	Inscription	Location	Year installed	Photo	Open Plaques ref	Notes
James Elroy Flecker (1885–1915)	"Poet and Dramatist was born here"	9 Gilmore Road; Lee SE13 5AD; 51.4611°N 0.0078°W	1986		502	
James Glaisher (1809–1903)	"Astronomer, Meteorologist and pioneer of weather forecasting lived here"	20 Dartmouth Hill; Blackheath SE10 8AJ; 51.4718°N 0.00816°W	1974		141	
Sir George Grove (1820–1900)	"Promoter of Musical Knowledge lived here"	14 Westwood Hill; Sydenham SE26 6QR; 51.42804°N 0.05897°W	2016		41513	
Frederick John Horniman (1835–1906)	"The Horniman Museum and Gardens were given to the people of London in 1901 by Frederick John Horniman who lived near this site"	Horniman Museum, London Road; Forest Hill SE23 3PQ; 51.44075°N 0.06083°W	1985		270	
Eleanor Marx (1855–1898)	"Socialist Campaigner lived and died here"	7 Jews Walk; Sydenham SE26 6PJ; 51.42923°N 0.05985°W	2008		10127	
Walter Maunder Annie Maunder (1851–1928) (1868–1947)	"Astronomers lived here 1907–1911"	69 Tyrwhitt Road; Brockley SE4 1QEJ; 51.46451°N 0.02448°W	2022		56717	
Mass-Observation (1937-1939)	"The founding headquarters of MASS-OBSERVATION a pioneering social survey 1937–1939"	6 Grote's Buildings; Blackheath, London SE3 0QGJ; 51.46697°N 0.00457°E	2022		57653	
Sir James Clark Ross (1800–1862)	"Polar Explorer lived here"	2 Eliot Place; Blackheath SE3 0QL; 51.4678°N 0.0007°E	1960		327	
Sir Ernest Shackleton (1874–1922)	"Antarctic Explorer Lived here"	12 Westwood Hill; Sydenham SE26 6QR; 51.4278°N 0.05876°W	1928		345	
Samuel Smiles (1812–1904)	"Author of Self-Help lived here"	11 Granville Park; Lewisham SE13 7DY; 51.4669°N 0.00448°W	1959		528	
John Tallis (1816–1876)	"Publisher of London Street Views lived here"	233 New Cross Road; New Cross Gate SE14 5UH; 51.4744°N 0.04413°W	1978		77	
Sir Stanley Unwin (1884–1968)	"Publisher was born here"	13 Handen Road; Lee SE12 8NP; 51.453°N 0.00962°E	1984		274	
Edgar Wallace (1875–1932)	"Writer lived here"	6 Tressillian Crescent; Lewisham SE4 1QJ; 51.464°N 0.02678°W	1960		123	

=== Merton ===
There are eleven blue plaques in the London Borough of Merton.

Subject	Inscription	Location	Year installed	Photo	Open Plaques ref	Notes
Josephine Butler (1828–1906)	"Champion of Women's Rights lived here 1890–1893"	8 North View; Wimbledon SW19 4UJ	2001		354	
Sir Ernst Chain (1906–1979)	"Biochemist and Developer of Penicillin lived here"	9 North View; Wimbledon SW19 4UJ	1973		177	
Robert Graves (1895–1985)	"Writer was born here"	1 Lauriston Road; Wimbledon SW19 4TL	1995		1369	
Georgette Heyer (1902–1974)	"Georgette Heyer 1902–1974 Novelist was born here"	103 Woodside; Wimbledon SW19 7BA	2015		39682	
John Innes (1829–1904)	"Founder of the John Innes Horticultural Institution lived here"	Manor House, Watery Lane; Wimbledon SW20 9AD	1978		339	
Sister Nivedita (Margaret Noble) (1867-1911)	"Educationalist and Campaigner for Indian Independence lived here"	21A High Street; Wimbledon SW19 5DX	2017		44019	
Dame Margaret Rutherford (1892–1972)	"Actress lived here 1895–1920"	4 Berkeley Place; Wimbledon SW19 4NN	2002		673	
Arthur Schopenhauer (1788–1860)	"Philosopher lived and studied here in 1803"	Eagle House, High Street; Wimbledon SW19 5EF	2005		205	
Graham Sutherland (1903-1980)	"Artist lived here as a child"	8 Dorset Road; Merton Park SW19 3HA	2025		74852	
Lionel Tertis (1876–1975)	"Viola soloist lived in a flat here 1961–1975"	42 Marryat Road; Wimbledon SW19 5BD	2015		39563	
Joseph Toynbee; Arnold Toynbee; (1815–1866); (1852–1883)	"Joseph Toynbee 1815–1866 Aural Surgeon and his son Arnold Toynbee 1852–1883 Social Philosopher lived here 1854–1866"	Beech Holme, 49 Parkside; Wimbledon SW19 5NB	2004		257	

=== Newham ===
There are two blue plaques in the London Borough of Newham.

Subject	Inscription	Location	Year installed	Photo	Open Plaques ref	Notes
Stanley Holloway (1890–1971)	"Actor and Humorist was born here"	25 Albany Road; Manor Park E12 5BE	2009		1995	
Will Thorne (1857–1946)	"Trade Union Leader and Labour M.P. lived here"	1 Lawrence Road; Plaistow E13 0QD	1987		449	

=== Redbridge ===
There are three blue plaques in the London Borough of Redbridge.

Subject	Inscription	Location	Year installed	Photo	Open Plaques ref	Notes
Clement Attlee (1883–1967)	"Prime Minister lived here"	17 Monkhams Avenue; Woodford Green IG8 0GB	1984		589	
Albert Mansbridge (1831–1913)	"Founder of the Workers' Educational Association lived here"	198 Windsor Road; Ilford IG1 1HE	1967		90	
Dame Kathleen Lonsdale (1903–1971)	"Crystallographer and peace campaigner lived here in early life"	19 Colenso Road, Seven Kings, Ilford IG2 7AG	2021		54853	

=== Richmond upon Thames ===
There are twenty eight blue plaques in the London Borough of Richmond upon Thames.

Person or institution	Inscription	Address	Year issued	Photo
John Beard (1717–1791) and William Ewart (1798–1869)	"John Beard c.1717–1791 Singer and William Ewart 1798–1869 Promoter of public libraries lived here"	Hampton Branch Library, Rose Hill; Hampton TW12 2AB	1992	
Lancelot 'Capability' Brown (1716–1783)	"Landscape Architect lived here 1764–1783"	Wilderness House, Moat Lane, Hampton Court Palace; Hampton Court KT8 9AR	2011	
Sir Edwin Chadwick (1801–1890)	"Public Health Reformer lived here"	5 Montague Road; Richmond TW3 1LB	1992	
Sir Noël Coward (1899–1973)	"Actor, Playwright and Songwriter born here"	131 Waldegrave Road; Teddington TW11 8BB	1995	
Walter de la Mare (1873–1956)	"Poet lived here 1940–1956"	South End House, Montpelier Row; Twickenham TW1 2NQ	1995	
Dame Ninette de Valois (1898–2001)	"Founder of the Royal Ballet lived here 1962–1982"	14 The Terrace, Barnes SW13 0NP	2006	
Richard Dimbleby (1913–1965)	"Broadcaster lived here 1937–1939"	Cedar Court, Sheen Lane; East Sheen SW14 8LY	2013	
Henry Fielding (1707–1754)	"Novelist lived here"	Milbourne House, Station Road, Barnes Green; Barnes SW13 0LW	1978	
David Garrick (1717–1779)	"Actor lived here"	Garrick's Villa, Hampton Court Road; TW12 2EJ	1970	
Amy Gentry (1903–1976)	"Pioneer of women's rowing lived here"	29 Thornton Road; East Sheen SW14 8NS	2026	
Kathleen Godfree (1896–1992)	"Kathleen ('Kitty') Godfree née McKane 1896–1992 Lawn Tennis Champion lived here 1936–1992"	55 York Avenue; East Sheen SW14 7LQ	2006	
James Henry Greathead (1844–1896)	"Railway and Tunnelling Engineer lived here 1885–1889"	3 St Mary's Grove; Barnes SW13 0JA	2000	
Sir William Hooker (1785–1865) and Sir Joseph Hooker (1817–1911)	"Botanists Directors of Kew Gardens lived here"	49 Kew Green; Kew TW9 3AA	2010	
Herbert Howells (1892–1983)	"Composer and teacher lived here 1946–1983"	3 Beverley Close; Barnes SW13 0EH	2011	
Arthur Hughes (1832–1915)	"Pre-Raphaelite Painter lived and died here"	Eastside House, 22 Kew Green; Kew TW9 3BH	1993	
Dame Celia Johnson (1908–1982)	"Actress was born here"	46 Richmond Hill; Richmond TW10 4QX	2008	
Henry Labouchere (1831–1912)	"Radical MP and Journalist lived here 1881–1903"	St James independent school for Boys, Pope's Villa, 19 Cross Deep; Twickenham TW1 4QG	2000	
Cardinal Newman (1801–1890)	"In this house John Henry Newman 1801–1890 later Cardinal Newman spent some of his early years"	Grey Court, Ham Street; Ham TW10 7HN	1981	
Bernardo O'Higgins (1778–1842)	"General, Statesman and Liberator of Chile lived and studied here"	Clarence House, 2 The Vineyard; Richmond TW10 6AQ	1994	
Kurt Schwitters (1887–1948)	"Artist lived here"	39 Westmoreland Road; Barnes SW13 9RZ	1984	
Princess Sophia Duleep Singh (1876–1948)	"Suffragette lived here"	37 Hampton Court Road, Richmond KT8 9BW	2023	
James Thomson (1700–1748)	"Poet Author of "Rule, Britannia!" lived and died here"	The Royal Hospital, Kew Foot Road; Richmond TW9 2TE	2005	
J.M.W. Turner R.A. (1775–1851)	"Painter designed and lived in this house"	Sandycombe Lodge, 40 Sandycoombe Road; Twickenham TW1 2LR	1977	
Ardaseer Cursetjee Wadia (1808–1877)	"Civil Engineer lived here from 1868"	55 Sheen Road, TW9 1YH	2021	
Sir Robert Watson-Watt (1892–1973)	"Pioneer of Radar lived here"	287 Sheen Lane; East Sheen SW14 8RN	2017	
Edward Whymper (1840–1911)	"Mountaineer lived here 1907–1911"	82 Waldegrave Road; Teddington TW11 8NY	2011	
Leonard Woolf (1880–1969) and Virginia Woolf (1882–1941)	"In this house Leonard and Virginia Woolf lived 1915–1924 and founded the Hogarth Press 1917"	Hogarth House, 34 Paradise Road; Richmond TW9 1SE	1976	
Sir Christopher Wren (1623–1732)	"Architect lived here"	The Old Court House, Hampton Court Green; East Molesey KT8 9BS; 51.4052492°N 0.3421341°W	1996	

=== Southwark ===
There are 20 blue plaques in the London Borough of Southwark.

Person or institution	Inscription	Address	Year issued	Photo
John Logie Baird (1888–1946)	"Television pioneer lived here"	3 Crescent Wood Road; Sydenham SE26 6RT	1977	
Annie Besant (1847–1933)	"Social Reformer lived here in 1874"	39 Colby Road; Gipsy Hill SE19 1HA	1963	
Joseph Chamberlain (1836–1914)	"Lived here"	188 Camberwell Grove; Denmark Hill SE5 8RJ	1920	
Sir Alan Cobham (1894–1973)	"Aviator was born here"	78 Denman Road; Peckham SE15 5NR	2003	
Henry Cotton (1907–1987)	"Champion Golfer lived here"	47 Crystal Palace Road; East Dulwich SE22 9EX	2017	
Dr. Charles Vickery Drysdale (1874–1961)	"A founder of the Family Planning Association opened his first birth control clinic here in 1921"	153a East Street; Walworth SE17 2SD	1988	
Gerald Durrell (1925–1995)	"Zoologist and writer lived here as a child"	43 Alleyn Park; Dulwich SE21 8AT	1990	
C. S. Forester (1899–1966)	"Novelist lived here"	58 Underhill Road; East Dulwich SE22 0QT	1990	
Leslie Howard (1893–1943)	"Actor and Film Director lived here"	45 Farquhar Road; Upper Norwood SE19 1SS	2013	
Derek Jarman (1942–1994)	"Film-maker, artist and gay rights activist lived and worked here"	Butler's Wharf Building, 36 Shad Thames, London, SE1 2YE	2019	
Boris Karloff (1887–1969)	"William Henry Pratt alias Boris Karloff 1887–1969 Actor was born here"	36 Forest Hill Road; Peckham Rye SE22 0RR	1998	
Dr. Harold Moody (1882–1947)	"Campaigner for Racial Equality lived and worked here"	164 Queens Road; Peckham SE15 2HP	1995	
Scipio Africanus Mussabini (1867–1927)	"Athletics Coach lived here"	84 Burbage Road; Herne Hill SE24 9HE	2012	
George Myers (1803–1875)	"Master Builder lived here 1842–1853"	131 St George's Road; Southwark SE1 6HY	1999	
Percy Lane Oliver (1878–1944)	"Founder of the First Voluntary Blood Donor Service lived and worked here"	5 Colyton Road; Peckham Rye SE22 0NE	1979	
Dr. Innes Pearse and Dr George Scott Williamson (1889–1978) (1884–1953)	"founded the Pioneer Health Centre here in 1926"	142 Queen's Road; Peckham SE15 2HP	2016	
Sax Rohmer (1883–1959)	"Sax Rohmer [Arthur Henry Ward] 1883–1959 Creator of Dr. Fu Manchu lived here"	51 Herne Hill; Herne Hill SE24 9NE	1985	
Ada Salter (1866–1942)	"Ada Salter 1866-1942 Social reformer and first woman mayor of a London borough lived here"	149 Lower Road; Rotherhithe SE16 2XL	2023	
Sir Eyre Massey Shaw (1830–1908)	"First Chief Officer of the Metropolitan Fire Brigade lived here 1878–1891"	Winchester House, 94 Southwark Bridge Road; Borough SE1 0EG	2000	
Sir Francis Pettit Smith (1808–1874)	"Pioneer of the Screw Propeller lived here 1864–1870"	Fountain House, 17 Sydenham Hill; Sydenham SE26 6SH	2007	

=== Sutton ===
There is a single blue plaque in the London Borough of Sutton.

Subject	Inscription	Location	Year installed	Photo	Open Plaques ref	Notes
William Hale White (aka "Mark Rutherford") 1831–1913	"Novelist lived here"	19 Park Hill; Carshalton SM5 3SA	1979		616	

=== Tower Hamlets ===
There are 23 blue plaques in the London Borough of Tower Hamlets.

Person or institution	Inscription	Address	Year issued	Photo
Dr. Barnardo (1845–1905)	"Began his work for children in a building on this site in 1866"	58 Solent House, Ben Jonson Road; Stepney E1 3NN	1953	
Thomas Barnardo (1845–1905)	"Founder of Dr Barnardo's Homes for children lived here 1875–1879"	32 Bow Road; Bow E3 4LN	2016	
Sir Thomas Fowell Buxton (1786–1845)	"Anti–Slavery Campaigner lived and worked here"	The Directors' House, Old Truman Brewery, 91 Brick Lane; Spitalfields E1	2007	
Edith Cavell (1865–1915)	"Pioneer of Modern Nursing in Belgium and Heroine of the Great War trained and worked here 1896–1901"	London Hospital, Whitechapel Road; Whitechapel E1 1BB	1988	
Kamal Chunchie (1886–1953)	"Pastor and anti-racist community activist worked here"	Queen Victoria Seamen’s Rest, 121–131 East India Dock Road, E14 6DF	2026	
Reverend P. T. B. 'Tubby' Clayton (1885–1972)	"Founder of Toc H lived here"	43 Trinity Square; Tower Hill EC3N 4DJ	1995	
Sir Jack Cohen (1898–1979)	"Entrepreneur Founder of Tesco Stores lived here as a child"	91 Ashfield Street; Whitechapel E1 2HA	2009	
Captain James Cook (1728–1779)	"On this site stood a house occupied for some years by Captain James Cook 1728–1779 Circumnavigator and Explorer"	88 Mile End Road; Mile End E1 4UN	1970	
Bud Flanagan (1896–1968)	"Comedian and Leader of the 'Crazy Gang' born here"	12 Hanbury Street; Spitalfields E1 6QR	1996	
Flying Bomb (13 June 1944)	"The First Flying Bomb on London Fell Here 13 June 1944"	Railway Bridge, Grove Road; Mile End E3	1988	
Mahatma Gandhi (1869–1948)	"Stayed here in 1931"	Kingsley Hall, Powis Road; Bromley by Bow E3 3HJ	1954	
Anna Maria Garthwaite (1690–1763)	"Designer of Spitalfields Silks lived and worked here"	2 Princelet Street; Spitalfields E1 6QH	1998	
Mark Gertler (1891–1939)	"Painter lived here"	32 Elder Street; Spitalfields E1 6BT	2000	
SS Great Eastern (1847–1929)	"THE GREAT EASTERN (launched 1858) largest steamship of the century was built here by I.K. Brunel and J.Scott Russell"	Burrells Wharf, 262 Westferry Road, Millwall, London E14 3TP	1954	
John Richard Green (1837–1883)	"Historian of the English people Lived here 1866–1869"	St Philip's Vicarage, 38 Newark Street; Whitechapel E1 2AA	1910	
The Reverend St. John Groser (1890–1966)	"Priest and Social Reformer lived here"	Royal Foundation of St Katherine, 2 Butcher Row; Limehouse E14 8DS	1990	
Mary Hughes (1860–1941)	"Friend of All in Need lived and worked here 1926–1941"	71 Vallance Road; Bethnal Green E2 5BS	1961	
Dr. Jimmy Mallon C. H. (1874–1961)	"Warden of Toynbee Hall Champion of Social Reform lived here"	Toynbee Hall, Commercial Street; Spitalfields E1 6LS	1984	
The Match Girls’ Strike	"took place here at the Bryant and May works in 1888"	3 Moreland Cottages, Bow Quarter, 60 Fairfield Road, Bow, London, E3 2QN	2022	
Ratcliff Cross	"This tablet is in memory of Sir Hugh Willoughby, Stephen Borough, William Borough, Sir Martin Frobisher and other navigators who, in the latter half of the sixteenth century, set sail from this reach of the River Thames near Ratcliff Cross to explore the northern seas"	King Edward Memorial Park, The Highway, Shadwell, London E1	1922	
Isaac Rosenberg (1890–1918)	"Poet and Painter lived in the East End and studied here"	Whitechapel Library, 77 High Street; Whitechapel E1 7QX	1987	
Lincoln Stanhope Wainwright (1847–1929)	"Vicar of St Peter's, London Docks lived here 1884–1929"	Clergy House, Wapping Lane; Wapping E1W 2RW	1961	
Israel Zangwill (1864–1926)	"Writer and Philanthropist lived here"	288 Old Ford Road; Old Ford E3 5SP	1965	

=== Waltham Forest ===
There are four blue plaques in the London Borough of Waltham Forest.

Subject	Inscription	Location	Year installed	Photo	Open Plaques ref	Notes
Alliott Verdon Roe (1877–1958)	"Under these arches...assembled his Avro No.1 triplane. In July 1909 he made the first all-British powered flight from Walthamstow Marsh"	Railway arches at Walthamstow Marsh Railway Viaduct, Walthamstow Marshes; Walthamstow E17	1983		491	
Harry Beck (1902–1974)	"Designer of the London Underground map was born here"	14 Wesley Road; Leyton E10 6JF	2013		12256	
James Hilton (1900–1954)	"Novelist and Scriptwriter lived here"	42 Oakhill Gardens; Woodford Green IG8 9DY	1997		529	
Solomon T. Plaatje (1876–1932)	"Black South African Writer and Campaigner for African Rights lived here"	25 Carnarvon Road; Walthamstow E10 6DW	1986		163	

=== Wandsworth ===
There are thirty blue plaques in the London Borough of Wandsworth.

Person or institution	Inscription	Address	Year issued	Photo
John Richard Archer (1863–1932)	"Mayor of Battersea who fought social and racial injustice lived here"	55 Brynmaer Road; Battersea SW11 4EN	2013	
H. M. Bateman (1887–1970)	"Cartoonist lived here 1910–1914"	40 Nightingale Lane; Clapham SW12 8TF	1997	
Edvard Beneš (1884–1948)	"President of Czechoslovakia lived here"	26 Gwendolen Avenue; Putney SW15 6EH	1978	
John Burns (1858–1943)	"Statesman lived here"	110 Clapham Common Northside; Clapham SW4 0JL	1950	
Norman Douglas (1868–1952)	"Writer lived here"	63 Albany Mansions, Albert Bridge Road; Battersea SW11 4QA	1980	
Gus Elen (1862–1940)	"Music Hall Comedian lived here"	3 Thurleigh Avenue; Balham SW12 8AN	1979	
George Eliot (1819–1880)	"Novelist lived here"	Holly Lodge, 31 Wimbledon Park Road; Wimbledon SW18 5SJ	1905	
Henri Gaudier-Brzeska (1891–1915)	"Sculptor and Artist worked here 1913-1914"	25 Winthorpe Road; Putney SW15 2LW	2017	
Thomas Hardy (1840–1928)	"Poet and novelist lived here 1878–1881"	172 Trinity Road; Tooting SW17 7HT	1962	
G. A. Henty (1832–1902)	"Author lived here"	33 Lavender Gardens; Clapham SW11 1DJ	1953	
Gerard Manley Hopkins (1844–1889)	"Poet lived and studied at Manresa House"	Gatepost at Manresa House, Holybourne Avenue; Roehampton SW15 4JD	1979	
Sir Robert Hunter (1844–1913)	Co-founder of the National Trust lived here 1869–1872	5 Louvaine Road, Battersea SW11 2AQ	2020	
Charles Sargeant Jagger (1885–1934)	"Sculptor lived and died here"	67 Albert Bridge Road; Battersea SW11 4QE	2000	
Fred Knee (1868–1914)	"London Labour Party Pioneer and Housing Reformer lived here"	24 Sugden Road; Clapham SW11 5EF	1986	
Sir Harry Lauder (1870–1950)	"Music Hall Artiste lived here 1903–1911"	46 Longley Road; Tooting SW17 9LL	1969	
Ted "Kid" Lewis (1893–1970)	"World Champion Boxer lived and died here"	Nightingale House, Nightingale Lane; Balham SW12 8NB	2003	
Earl Lloyd-George of Dwyfor (1929–1992)	"Prime Minister lived here"	3 Routh Road; Wandsworth Common, Wandsworth SW18 3SW	2004	
Sir Kenneth MacMillan (1929–1992)	"Choreographer lived here"	14 Lyford Road, Wandsworth SW18 3LG	2004	
Seán O'Casey (1880–1964)	"Playwright lived here at flat No 49"	49 Overstrand Mansions, Prince of Wales Drive; Battersea SW11 4EZ	1993	
Fred Russell (1862–1957)	"Father of Modern Ventriloquism lived here in flat No.71 1914–1926"	71 Kenilworth Court, Lower Richmond Road; Putney SW15 1EN	2009	
Abdus Salam (1926–1996)	"Physicist, Nobel Laureate and champion of science in developing countries lived here"	8 Campion Road; Putney SW16 6NW	2020	
Sir Edwin Saunders (1814–1901)	"Dentist to Queen Victoria lived and died here"	Fairlawn, 89 Wimbledon Parkside; Wimbledon SW19 5LR	1997	
Short Brothers; Eustace Short (1875–1932); Horace Short (1872–1917); Oswald Short (1883–1969)	"Aeronautical Engineers worked in arches 75 and 81"	Arch 75, Queen's Circus; Battersea Park SW8 4ND	2013	
Charles Haddon Spurgeon (1834–1892)	"Preacher Lived Here"	99 Nightingale Lane; Balham SW12 8LZ	1914	
Marie Spartali Stillman (1844–1927)	"Pre-Raphaelite artist and model lived here"	The Shrubbery, 2 Lavender Gardens; Battersea SW11 1DL	2023	
Algernon Charles Swinburne (1837–1909) and Theodore Watts-Dunton (1832–1914)	"Algernon Charles Swinburne (1837–1909) – Poet – and his friend Theodore Watts-Dunton (1832–1914) Poet-Novelist-Critic Lived and died here"	The Pines, 11 Putney Hill; Putney SW15 6BA	1926	
Edward Thomas (1878–1917)	"Essayist and poet lived here"	61 Shelgate Road; Clapham SW11 1BA	1949	
John Walter (1739–1812)	"Founder of The Times lived here"	113 Clapham Common Northside; Clapham SW4 9SN	1977	
William Wilberforce (1759–1833)	"On the site behind this house stood until 1904 Broomwood House (formerly Broomfield) where William Wilberforce resided during the campaign against slavery which he successfully conducted in Parliament"	111 Broomwood Road; Battersea SW11 6JTJ	1906	
Edward Adrian Wilson (1872–1912)	"Antarctic explorer and naturalist lived here"	Battersea Vicarage, 42 Vicarage Crescent; Battersea SW11 3LD	1935	

=== City of London ===
There is a single London scheme plaque in the City of London, erected by the Society of Arts in 1876. In April 1879, the Society approached the Corporation of the City of London to ask for their co-operation, and "to undertake the erection of suitable Memorial Tablets within the City Boundaries." The matter was referred the City Lands Committee and approved. From then, until 1985, no further plaques were erected within the city by the official London plaque scheme. Having reached this agreement, the Corporation was late to initiate their own scheme. A suggestion from the Society of Arts for a memorial to the poet Thomas Gray at 41 Cornhill was approved by the City Lands Committee in 1881 but nothing came of it, although at the suggestion of the London County Council in the 1900s a memorial to Elizabeth Fry was erected at The Cedars, West Ham, then in Essex, in which she had lived from 1829-1844, the property subsequently acquired by the Corporation. A scheme to commemorate notable individuals, buildings and sites of historical interest in the City with rectangular blue plaques was started by the Corporation of London on 25th June 1923 with a memorial to Geoffrey Chaucer at the Post Office, Aldgate, the site of a house in which he had lived during 1374 (plaque since lost). A memorial erected by the LCC to John Thadeus Delane, former editor of The Times, at Serjeants' Inn, Temple, at the eastern end of the City (Ward of Farringdon without) in 1910, lost during the 1935-1945 war, was exempt from the arrangement; the historic Inns of Court not being subject to the Corporation or the Mayor of the City of London.

In 1985, the Labour-led Greater London Council under Ken Livingstone, taking matters into its own hands after a long-promised Corporation plaque had failed to materialise, erected a black 'medallion' shaped plaque commemorating the site of the Congregational Memorial Hall where the Labour Party had been formed in 1900 at Caroone House in Farringdon. The building was demolished in 2004 and the plaque removed from the scheme by English Heritage. The plaque still exists, having been privately rehung at two different office buildings built on the site of Caroone House in the intervening years.

Subject	Inscription	Location	Year installed	Photo	Open Plaques ref	Notes
Samuel Johnson 1709–1784	"Author lived here"	Dr Johnson's House, Gough Square; Holborn EC4A 3DE	1876		1364	This is one of the 15 surviving plaques of 35 erected by the Society of Arts (later the Royal Society of Arts) between 1867 and 1901. As was often the case with memorials manufactured in the early days of the scheme, it is not blue, but terra-cotta in colour.

=== City of Westminster ===
There are 336 blue plaques in the City of Westminster.

== See also ==
- List of blue plaques
- List of former English Heritage blue plaques
