= The Eaton House Group of Schools =

Group of private schools in London, England

- Logo used by the group (red cross pattée)
- Type: Private
- Industry: Education
- Headquarters: London, England, United Kingdom

The Eaton House Group of Schools is a group of private schools, all situated in London. It is composed of the Eaton House the Manor Nursery, Eaton House the Manor Pre-Preparatory, Eaton House the Manor Preparatory, Eaton House the Manor Girls' School, Eaton House Belgravia Pre-Preparatory, and Eaton House Belgravia Preparatory. The group became a limited liability company, with Sovereign Capital becoming the majority shareholder, when principal Hilary Harper retired and sold the company in 2016. The schools are non-selective at ages 3 and 4. In June 2021, Eaton House Schools became part of the Dukes Education group of schools.

The schools have a non-denominational Christian ethos, and a carol service at the local church is a regular occurrence every year. Places are allocated on a first-come first-served basis, sometimes with regard to those with previous family connections with the school. In one reported case in 2017, 160 students applied for around 30 places at the Manor at age 4.). The group is a member of the Independent Association of Prep Schools.

== Eaton House Belgravia Pre-Prep and Prep ==
Eaton House Belgravia Pre-Preparatory and Prep

Location
- Belgravia; Kensington and Chelsea, London, SW1W 9BA; England

Information
- Motto: Win with grace, lose with dignity
- Established: 1897
- Headmaster: Ross Montague
- Gender: Boys
- Age: 4 to 11
- Enrolment: 200 (approx.)
- Houses: Red; Green; Yellow; Blue
- Colours: Red, Green
- Publication: The Column
- Website: http://www.eatonhouseschools.com/

Thomas Sale Morton was born in 1867 and died on 21 January 1962, aged 95. Educated at Charterhouse School and Clare College, Cambridge, Morton was a private tutor and author of books on the classics (many of his works were used in schools as textbooks), and had previously taught at Summer Fields School. In 1897, Morton was encouraged to open a preparatory school by Helen (Nellie) Artie Tarleton Belles, the mother of Harold Macmillan, whom he was tutoring at the time.

The school was originally opened at 35 Cliveden Place, but it was moved many times in the Belgravia area, and in 1937 the current premises at Eaton Gate were purchased, and the school was renamed Eaton House School. During World War II, the pupils were evacuated to Haines Hill in Berkshire, where they boarded until the end of the war. Morton, a member of the Classical Association, abandoned the school soon after it was renamed, and moved to teach at The Hall School, Hampstead later in his career.

Following the departure of Morton, the school was then run by Robin T. Gladstone, identified to the pupils as a relative of William Ewart Gladstone. Gladstone then left the school to set up another school in East Grinstead. Due to Gladstone's ownership, the school was commonly known to students and parents as 'Mr Gladstone's day school'. In 1977, the school was renamed Eaton House Belgravia.

In 1998, Lucy Watts became headmistress of the school, retiring in July 2015. She was replaced by Annabel Abbott. In September 2017, Huw May became Headmaster of Eaton House Belgravia Pre-Prep School in Eaton Gate. It was announced in 2018 that the school would expand on the same site to take boys from 8-11 over the next three years. In January 2024, Ross Montague was appointed new headmaster.

In October 2013, a media controversy was triggered over the banning of nut consumption at breakfast for pupils at home, in addition to bans on consumption of certain foods in the school; however, no complaints appear to have been made to the school over the policy.

Eaton House Pre-Preparatory has taken part in Belgravia Christmas Sunday, and regularly takes part in the wreath-laying ceremony during the Annual Service of Remembrance at the Cenotaph on Armistice Day.

== Eaton House The Manor Pre-Prep and Prep ==
=== History ===
Eaton House The Manor Pre-Preparatory
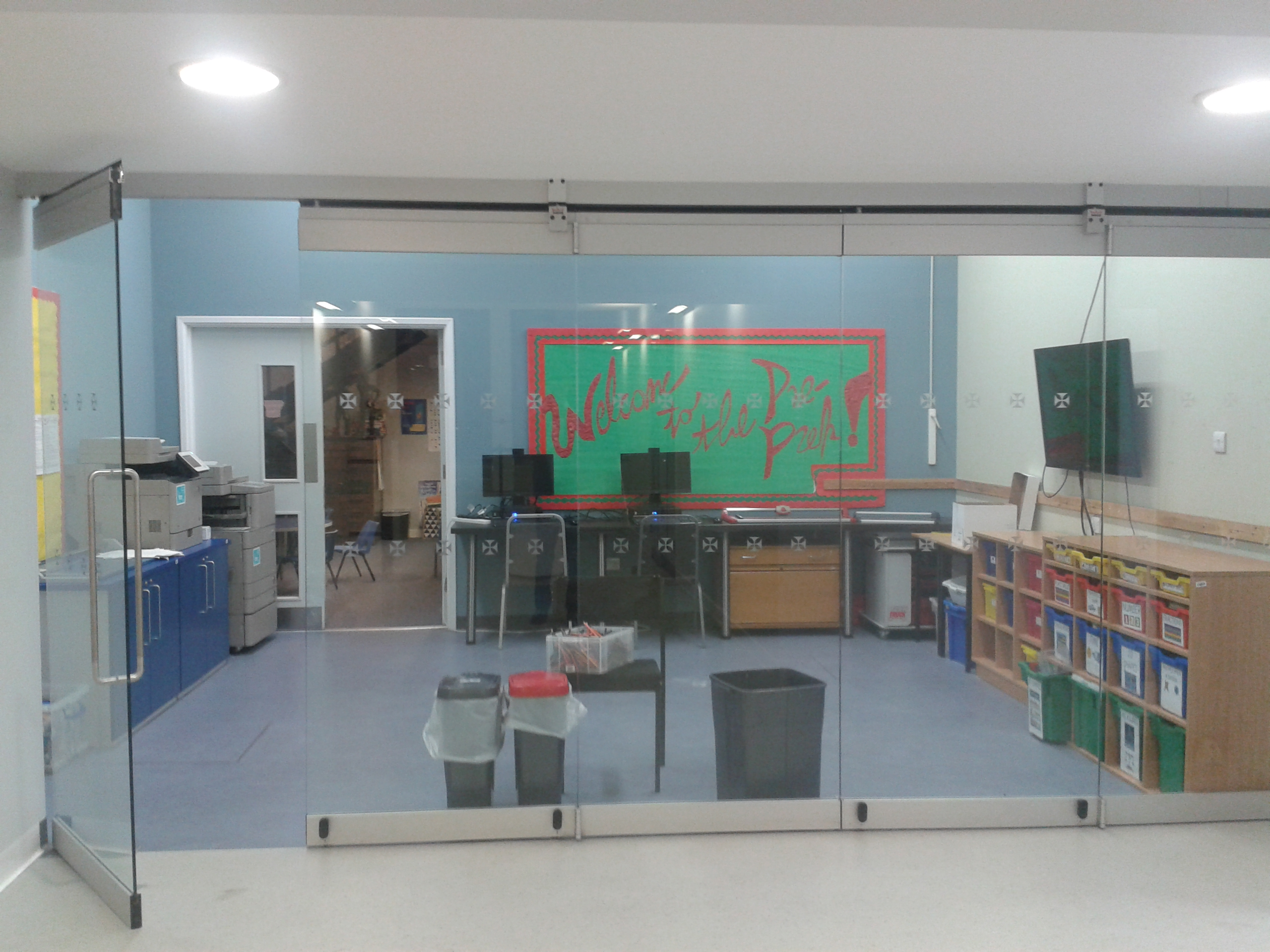

Location
- Clapham Common Northside; Wandsworth, London, SW4 9RU; England

Information
- Motto: In Pursuit Of Excellence
- Established: September 1993 (current form)
- Headmaster: David Wingfield
- Gender: Boys
- Age: 4 to 8
- Enrolment: 220
- Houses: Arundel; Balmoral; Stirling; Windsor
- Colours: Red, Green
- Publication: The Column
- Website: http://www.eatonhouseschools.com/

The Harper family purchased the Grade II listed Byrom House at 58 Clapham Common Northside to convert it into a school consisting of a nursery, pre-preparatory school, and preparatory school. These opened in September 1993, and this building acts as a management base for the group. A girls' school has since been added.

Byrom House (built c. 1792 by John Farrer) was formerly owned by London South Bank University and Battersea College of Domestic Science, before that the Manor House School (see below) stood on the site. Before it became a school, the building was sold by Farrer in 1841, and became The Beeches. In 1905–06, a large extension was added to the right of the building.

==== Manor House School ====
The Manor House School was founded by F.C. Maxwell (Note: Some sources incorrectly state 'Stanley Maxwell', this was in fact his son.) in 1876. In 1898, Stanley Maxwell, his son and an old boy of the school, took over as headmaster of the school, before deciding to close it permanently in 1938. Stanley Maxwell was an accomplished teacher, and served as chairman of the Private Schools Association from 1909 to 1939, as well as on the Government Departmental Committee on Private Schools in 1930. Stanley Maxwell also became secretary of the College of Preceptors, holding this position until his death on 20 September 1944. He was also an amateur astronomer, and was elected a fellow of the Royal Astronomical Society on 11 February 1910.

Eaton House The Manor Preparatory
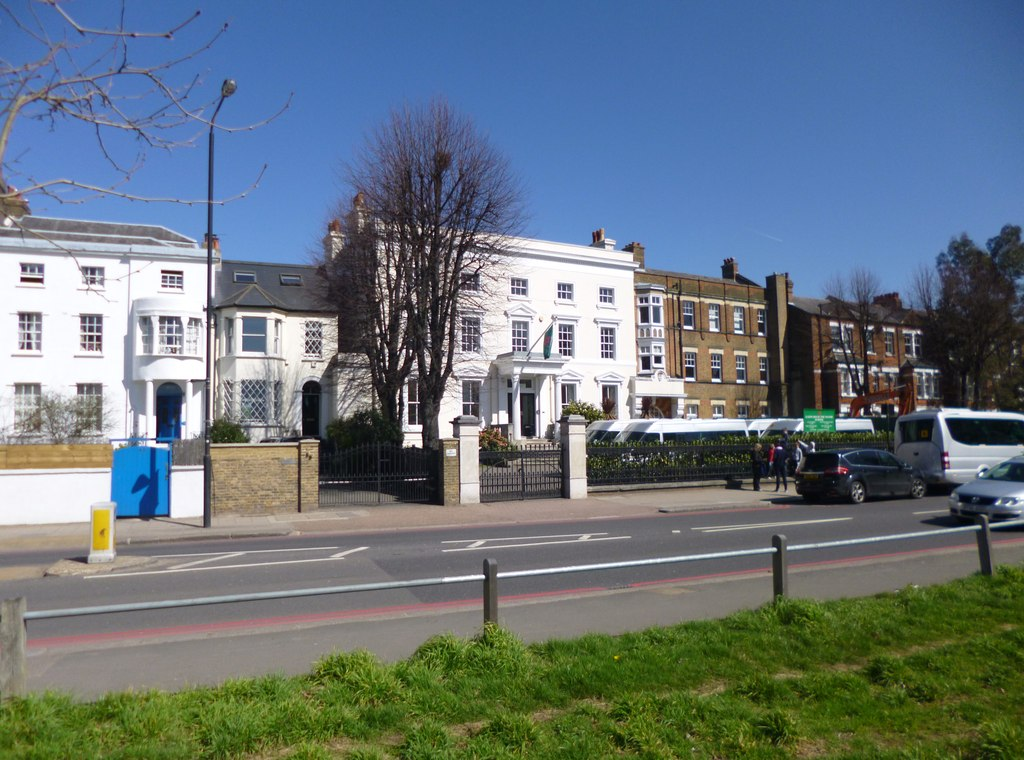

Location
- Clapham Common Northside; Wandsworth, London, SW4 9RU; England

Information
- Type: Preparatory school
- Motto: In Pursuit Of Excellence
- Established: 1876; September 1993 (current form)
- Headmistress: Sarah Segrave
- Gender: Boys
- Age: 8 to 13
- Enrolment: 230 (approx.)
- Houses: Arundel; Balmoral; Stirling; Windsor
- Colours: Red, Green
- Publication: The Column
- Former pupils: Old Manorians
- School Song: There Is A Redeemer
- Website: http://www.eatonhouseschools.com/

=== Entry and leavers ===
Entry from the Pre-Prep into the Prep is now decided using a system of 'continuous assessment' in year 2, instead of an exam (as was practised previously). However, those looking to enter from other schools must still take the examination.

Most boys in the Pre-Prep go on to the Prep school, with a small number leaving for other boarding or day schools, while most boys leaving the Prep go on to major public schools.

=== Premises ===
The building contains a 'wildlife garden', opened in April 1997, construction of which was funded by the Bank of Ireland.

An extensive refurbishment programme took place from early 2003, continuing into 2017.

=== Heads ===
In 2016, Sarah Segrave was given the role of headmistress of the Prep (having previously served as headmistress in the Girls' School, and before that the Pre-Prep) due to the retirement of Jeremy Edwards (previously master of Westminster Under School), who in turn succeeded Sebastian Hepher.

=== Philanthropy ===
The school has worked with charities over the years, and the school is twinned with Adabase Primary School in Ghana, providing the school with funds and equipment in the past.

== Eaton House The Manor Girls' School ==
Eaton House The Manor Girls' School
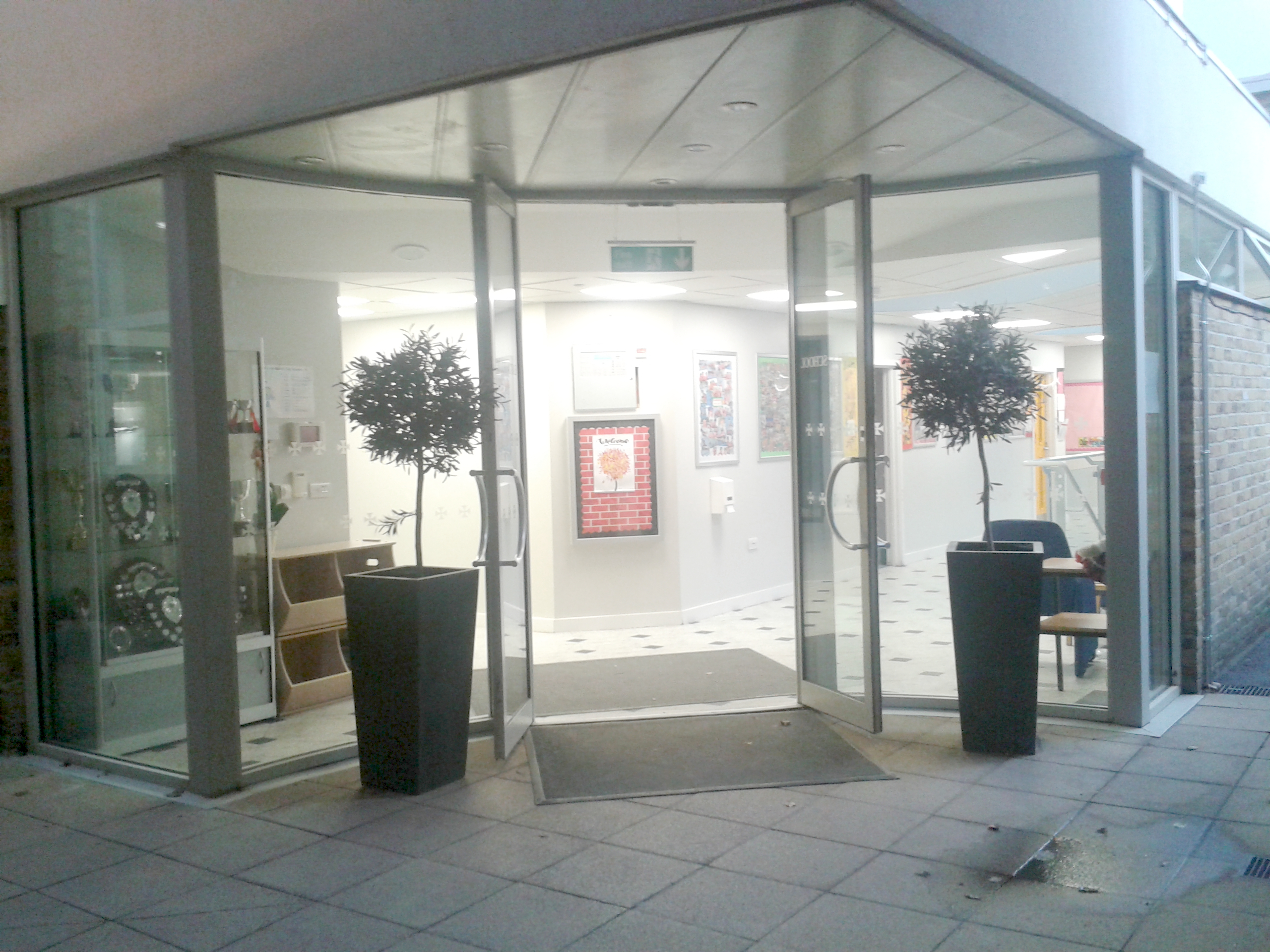

Location
- Clapham Common Northside; Wandsworth, London, SW4 9RU; England

Information
- Motto: In Pursuit Of Excellence
- Established: 2008
- Headmaster: Oliver Snowball
- Gender: Girls
- Age: 4 to 11
- Enrolment: 220 (approx.)
- Houses: Arundel; Balmoral; Stirling; Windsor
- Colours: Red, Green
- Publication: The Column
- Website: http://www.eatonhouseschools.com/

In 2008 refurbishment took place at the Manor, and a girls' school was built on the site in a new building on the compound, containing an underground gymnasium. Oliver Snowball is the headmaster.

== Eaton House The Manor Nursery ==
Roosha Sue has served as headmistress of the Nursery since 2004, teaching in the Manor Pre-Prep before taking up this post.

Eaton House The Manor Nursery
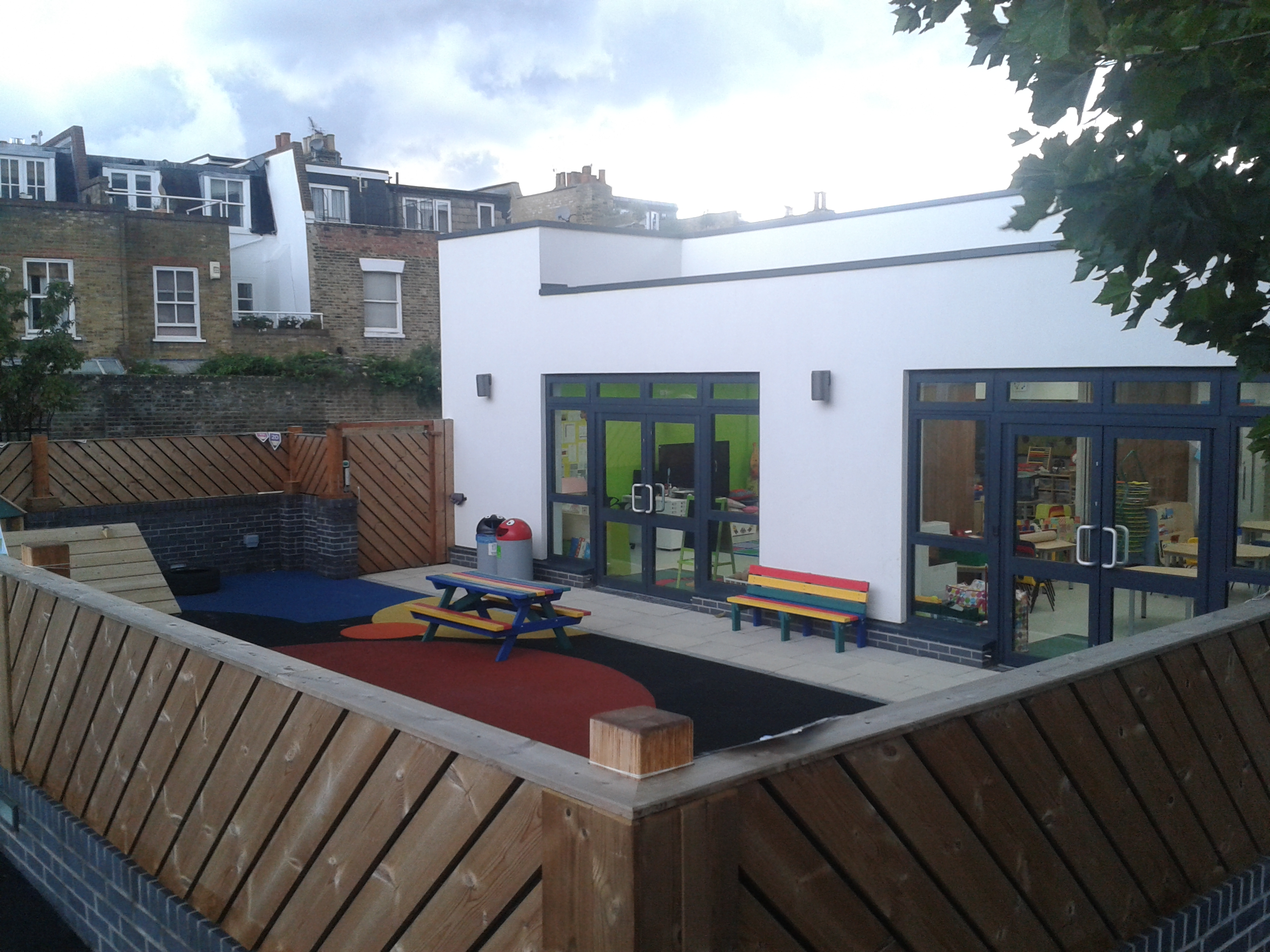

Location
- Clapham Common Northside; Wandsworth, London, SW4 9RU; England

Information
- Motto: In Pursuit Of Excellence
- Established: September 1993
- Headmistress: Roosha Sue
- Gender: Co-educational
- Age: 3 to 4.5
- Publication: The Column
- Website: http://www.eatonhouseschools.com/

== Notable alumni ==
- Harold Macmillan, 1st Earl of Stockton, Prime Minister of the United Kingdom from 1957 to 1963, also serving in various ministries before that and as a regular MP afterwards, and World War I veteran, was educated at Eaton Gate Preparatory School, which later became Eaton House Belgravia.
- Tony Benn, veteran Labour politician, serving as an MP and cabinet minister, Postmaster General, Chairman of the Labour Party, leadership challenger, president of Stop the War Coalition, and World War II veteran, was educated at Eaton Gate Preparatory School, which later became Eaton House Belgravia.
- Richard Norton, 8th Baron Grantley, a Conservative hereditary peer, councillor and candidate in 1983 (later switching his party allegiance and becoming the first UKIP peer in the House of Lords), was educated at Eaton House.
- Julian Amery, a Conservative MP, minister, patron of the Monday Club, life peer, journalist, World War II veteran, and son-in-law of Harold Macmillan, attended Eaton House.
- Adam Nicolson, author, attended Eaton House.
- Ronald Knox, priest, theologian, and author of detective stories, was educated at Eaton Gate Preparatory School, which later became Eaton House Belgravia.
- Archibald Wavell, 1st Earl Wavell, Field Marshall in the British Army, serving in World War I, the Second Boer War, and World War II, was educated at Eaton Gate Preparatory School, which later became Eaton House Belgravia.
- Anthony Asquith, film director and son of former Prime Minister of the United Kingdom H.H. Asquith, was educated at Eaton Gate Preparatory School, which later became Eaton House Belgravia. Asquith was also privately tutored by Morton at 10 Downing Street while his father was Prime Minister.
- Philip Pullman, author, attended Eaton House Belgravia.
- Christopher Hall, television producer, attended Eaton House Belgravia.
- Laurence Olivier, actor and president of the National Theatre, was educated at Eaton Gate Preparatory School, which later became Eaton House Belgravia.
- Bear Grylls, adventurer and TV presenter, attended Eaton House.
- Eddie Redmayne, actor and Oscar winner, attended Eaton House.
- Christopher O'Neill, financier and Swedish royal, attended Eaton House.
- Sheperd Paine, American historian and miniature modeller, attended Eaton House.

An official alumni society used to exist from at least 2007 to 2009 for old boys and girls of all ages; however, there is no mention of it on their current website or literature, and reasoning suggests that it may have been discontinued.

== Notable staff ==
- George Mills, author of children's books, taught at Eaton Gate Preparatory School, which later became Eaton House Belgravia, from 1926 to 1938.
- Alastair Humphreys, adventurer and motivational speaker, worked as an SEN assistant at Eaton House The Manor Prep in the late 2000s.
