= Hammersmith Terrace =

Street in Hammersmith, London

Coordinates: 51°29′23″N 0°14′33″W

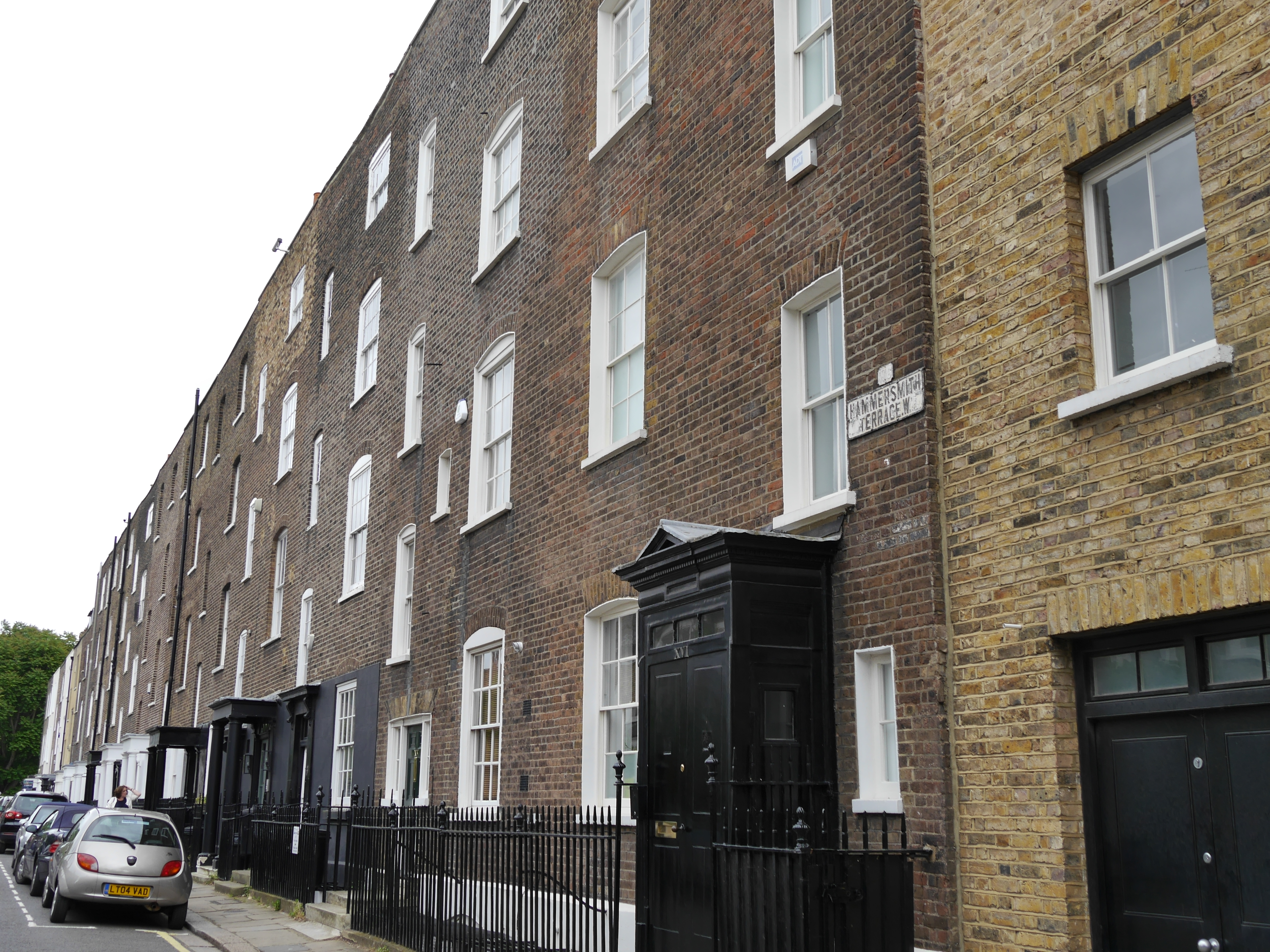
Hammersmith Terrace

Hammersmith Terrace is a street of listed, brick-built houses in Hammersmith, west London. All of the seventeen houses in the terrace are Grade II listed, except No. 7 which is Grade II*. The street was built in about 1770 and has been home to several notable artists. The 70-foot gardens reach right down to the Thames, giving the owners riparian rights. There are views across the river to the fields of St Paul's School.

== Past residents ==
No. 1 was home to the Doves Press in the first decade of the twentieth century.

No. 3 was once home to the actress and singer Rosemond Mountain (Mrs Mountain) (1768–1841). It was later home to the Arts and Crafts printer Emery Walker (1851–1933) for 24 years, until he moved to no. 7 in 1903. The calligrapher Edward Johnston (1872–1944) lived here from 1905 to 1912 and is commemorated with a blue plaque.

No. 5 was lived in by the artist engraver William Harcourt Hooper, at least until 1911.

No. 6, owned by the Needham family, descendants of the inventor of the shotgun cartridge ejector mechanism, was where the writer J. R. Ackerley took up residence in 1925.

7 Hammersmith Terrace was home to the Arts and Crafts printer Emery Walker from 1903 to 1933. It is now a museum.

No. 8 was home to May Morris, William Morris's daughter, and then the artist Mary Annie Sloane.

No. 10 was home to the art critic Frederic George Stephens.

No. 11 was the home of the Quaker politician T. Edmund Harvey (1875–1955) and his wife, Alice Irene, from 1911 to 1916, and from then the home and office of architect Fred Rowntree (1860–1927).

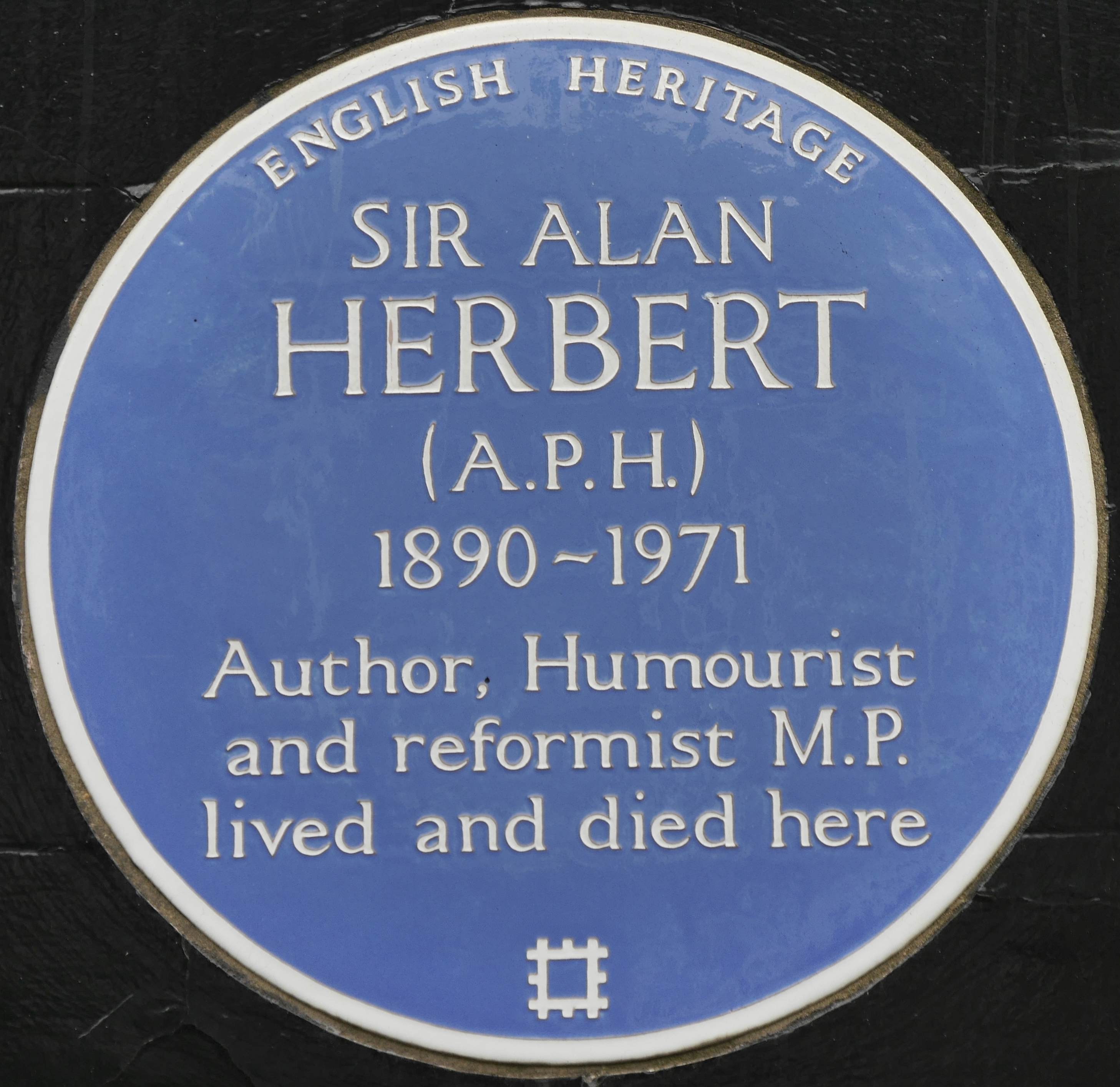
Blue plaque to A. P. Herbert on No. 12

No. 12 was home to A. P. Herbert, humorist, novelist, playwright and law reform activist until his death in 1971.

No. 13 was home to the artist Philip James de Loutherbourg until his death there in 1812.

No. 15 was lived in by Sir Clifton Wintringham (1720–1794), physician to the King. From the mid-1950s until his death in 1995, the composer and music critic Hugo Cole lived at No 15.

No 16 was built in 1775 for the actor and playwright Arthur Murphy (1727–1805), who lived there for many years. He was later declared bankrupt, and the debtor's porch is said to have been built so that a look out for bailiffs could be kept. Victor Pasmore was a lodger at the house in the 1940s. It was bought by Mr and Mrs John Martineau (both architects) in 1986, and they carried out major renovations.
