= Sheperd Paine =

American military historian

- Born: 29 July 1946; Berlin, Germany
- Died: 1 August 2015 (aged 69)
- Education: University of Chicago
- Occupations: Author, Historian, Scale Modeler
- Years active: 1972-2015
- Website: https://www.military-miniature-society-of-illinois.com/shep-paine-education-fund

Howard Sheperd "Shep" Paine (29 July 1946 – 1 August 2015) was a military historian and a collector of militaria best known for the more than three decades he spent as a modeler, sculptor, miniature figure painter, and champion of the diorama. He forwarded the unique hobby/art form of military miniatures around the world through his own pieces, numerous "how-to" hobby books, and championing of the "open system" of judging in use at many of the most prestigious modeling shows and exhibitions today.

== Biography ==
Sheperd Paine was the first child born to American parents in Berlin after the end of World War II. After leaving Berlin, his family moved to London for a year, during which period he attended Eaton House School. Paine's family then moved again to New England, where he attended St. Paul's School. After service as a sergeant in the U.S. Army, he received a BA from the University of Chicago, and lived in the Windy City for most of his life.

For many years, Paine worked in the military history field as a free-lance artist, sculptor, and writer. His commissions included dioramas for private collections (notably those of Andrew Wyeth and Forbes Magazine), museum projects, and several large commemorative sculptures for the Franklin Mint.

Special displays of his work have been seen at the Brandywine River Museum, the Campbell Museum, and the St. Louis Museum of Science and Natural History. He was the author of four books; his work has been featured in articles in Sports Illustrated and Fortune (along with many hobby magazines), and he is the subject of a hardcover biography/career overview entitled Sheperd Paine: The Life and Work of a Master Modeler and Military Historian written by Chicago rock critic and fellow miniaturist Jim DeRogatis.

Paine had a broad knowledge of military history (particularly uniforms and equipment) with proficiency in the American Civil War, Napoleonic Wars, and the two World Wars. For thirty years he was an active collector of military antiques, specializing in the Victorian and Napoleonic periods. He was a director of the Napoleonic Historical Society, and had been a member of the Company of Military Historians since 1972, being elected a fellow of that organization in 1980. He remained active with the Military Miniature Society of Illinois (MMSI), a Chicago-area club devoted to the miniatures hobby and many other aspects of military history, until his sudden death from a stroke in 2015.

== Modeling work ==
Most modelers and miniaturists first became aware of Paine's work through the series of "How to Build a Diorama" tip sheets included with Monogram models of tanks, military vehicles, and airplanes in the 1970s and '80s. He later did dioramas that were included in the catalogs published by Tamiya models, as well as a few projects for Dragon Models.

Paine also is well known for his box dioramas or shadow boxes, scratchbuilt scenes (usually with figures 100mm tall) set inside a box, which enabled him to control the viewpoint and set the mood via internal lighting and occasionally special effects such as mirrors. His boxes include "In the Turret of the Monitor, 1862"; "The Gun Deck of the HMS Victory at Trafalgar, 1805"; "Napoleon at the Tomb of Frederick the Great, 1806"; "The Remnants of an Army, 1812"; "To a Fair Wind... and Victory! Nelson on the Eve of Copenhagen, 1801," and "Rembrandt's Night Watch."

Paine told the Chicago Sun-Times: "When you get into dioramas, you are creating a work of art. I don't use the word with a capital 'A' but you are creating a 3-D painting, and the satisfaction you get is much the same. In some ways, dioramas are so interesting because they combine so many elements in different forms: You are basically telling a story without words. It's like silent movies, except you don't have anybody moving."

== Books ==
- How to Build Dioramas
- Building and Painting Scale Figures
- Modeling Tanks and Military Vehicles
- How to Photograph Scale Models
