= Hugo Cole =

English composer and music critic (1917-1995)

Hugo Cole (6 July 1917 – 2 March 1995) was an English composer, cellist, critic and author on musical subjects.

== Education and early career ==
Cole was born in London, one of three children of a successful barrister, Arthur Frederick Andrew Cole (1883–1968), and his wife, Margaret Henrietta, born Gaselee (1882–1971). His older sister Catherine later became famous as the children's writer Catherine Storr.

Cole was educated at Winchester School, where he first began playing the horn and the cello, then at King's College, Cambridge (reading natural sciences). Cole was a conscientious objector, and his application to join the Friends' Ambulance Unit during the war was turned down because of his severe stammer - this affliction led to his later interest in the Alexander Technique of relaxation, and to music therapy.

During the war he played as a cellist with the Halle Orchestra and the D'Oyly Carte Opera Company before continuing his studies at the Royal College of Music in 1944: cello with Ivor James, harmony with R.O. Morris and composition with Herbert Howells. There was some further study in Paris over two summers with Nadia Boulanger.

== Composition ==
By the late 1940s Cole's interest had shifted from performing towards composing, including works for amateur performers. He produced operas (mostly for children or amateurs and often using his own libretto), choral, orchestral and chamber music. His first children's opera (of five), The Asses' Ears, was written in 1950 for Rokeby Preparatory School in Wimbledon. A Company of Fools, given its first performance at Queen's College Oxford in November 1955 under Bernard Rose, sets eight poems by James Kirkup, using chorus, a quartet of soloists and strings. Flax into Gold: The Story of Rumpelstiltskin (1957), is a children's opera with a libretto by Cole's sister, Catherine Storr.

His 1959 opera The Tunnel won the John Lewis Partnership prize for amateur productions, and was staged on 24 October 1960 and following nights in the Auditorium of the (then new) John Lewis shop in Oxford Street. Jonah (1967), with a libretto by the composer, is scored for speaker, baritone soloist, chorus and orchestra, and is described as "an opera-cantata for stage or concert use". Commissioned by the Downside Choral Society it was first performed at Westminster Cathedral Hall on 30 March 1963, conducted by Roger Bevan, and repeated in Somerset.

But according to his Times obituary, Cole's "decidedly English" compositional style was never in fashion, and he mostly gave up composing once he was appointed as a critic on The Guardian in 1965. There were a few late compositions, including another children's opera, The Fair Traders (1971). His final piece was Winter Meetings - Dialogues for chamber orchestra, completed in 1975 and performed by the Havant Symphony Orchestra on 8 November 1975.

== Critic and author ==
Cole wrote for The Guardian for more than 30 years (1965-95), working with Edward Greenfield and Gerald Larner. He was also a regular contributor to The Listener (1974-86), and wrote the regular 'The Musical Scene' column in Country Life for over 20 years. He also contributed to Grove's Dictionary of Music (including entries on Arthur Bliss, Francis Chagrin, Children's Opera, Wilfrid Josephs, Elizabeth Maconchy and Humphrey Searle).

He also wrote several books, including a concise guide to musical notation that tackles its modern evolution, such as the notation of electronic music and the development of computer notation as it was in 1974. His book on the music of his friend Malcolm Arnold (1989) is one of the earliest analytical studies of Arnold's music, previously not always considered "serious".

== Personal life ==
Cole was an enthusiastic supporter of the Pianola Society, and a keen cyclist - often using his bicycle to travel to concerts. In 1949 he married Gwyneth John Eedy - an artist and teacher of the Alexander Technique - and there were two daughters. Their address for over 40 years was 15 Hammersmith Terrace, London W6. He died, aged 77, after complications from lymphoma. Daughter Tamasin Cole (1951–2014) was a graphic designer and illustrator.

== Works ==
Composition

- Suite for two descant recorders (1949)
- The Asses' Ears (1950), children's opera
- Divertimento (1950), chamber ensemble
- Piano Trio (1950)
- Six Sitwell Songs (1950)
- String Quartet in A (1951), Clements Memorial Prize
- A Statue for the Mayer (1952), children's opera, for Wimbledon High School
- The Hammersmith Gallop (1952), trumpet and piano
- Variations for Orchestra (pre 1953)
- Concerto for flute, viola and strings (1953)
- Concerto for horn and chamber orchestra (1954)
- A Company of Fools (1954), chorus. soloists and strings
- Capriccio (1955) for flute and piano
- Eleven Nursery Rhymes (1955) for two equal voices, Novello
- Persephone (1955), children's opera, for Wimbledon High School
- Quartet for oboe and strings (1955)
- Of the Nativity of Christ (1956), double chorus, setting William Dunbar
- Flax into Gold: The Story of Rumpelstiltskin (1957), children's opera, libretto by Catherine Storr
- The Tunnel (1959), opera
- Black Lion Dances (1962), orchestra
- Baron Munchausen (1963), cantata for baritone, chorus and orchestra
- Jonah (1963), opera-cantata for speaker, baritone, chorus and orchestra
- Serenade (1965) for nine wind instruments
- The Falcon (1968), one-act opera, fp. Shawford Mill, Bath
- The Fair Traders (1971), children's opera, fp. Wokingham Town Hall
- Winter Meetings (1975), chamber orchestra
- Magnificat, for chorus and organ/piano
- Nunc dimittis Collegium Magdalenae
- Miniature Quartets Nos. 1 and 2
- Two Romantic pieces for cello

Books

- Eleven Nursery Rhymes, music with illustrations (from wood engravings) by Gwyneth Eedy, Novello (1958)
- (with Anna Shuttleworth). Playing The Cello (1964)
- Sounds and Signs: Aspects of Musical Notation (1974)
- The Changing Face of Music (1979)
- Malcolm Arnold: An Introduction to His Music (1989)
- (with Keith Spence). The Young People's Book of Music (1995)
