= 7 Hammersmith Terrace =

House in the London Borough of Hammersmith and Fulham, England

Coordinates: 51.489823°N 0.242515°W

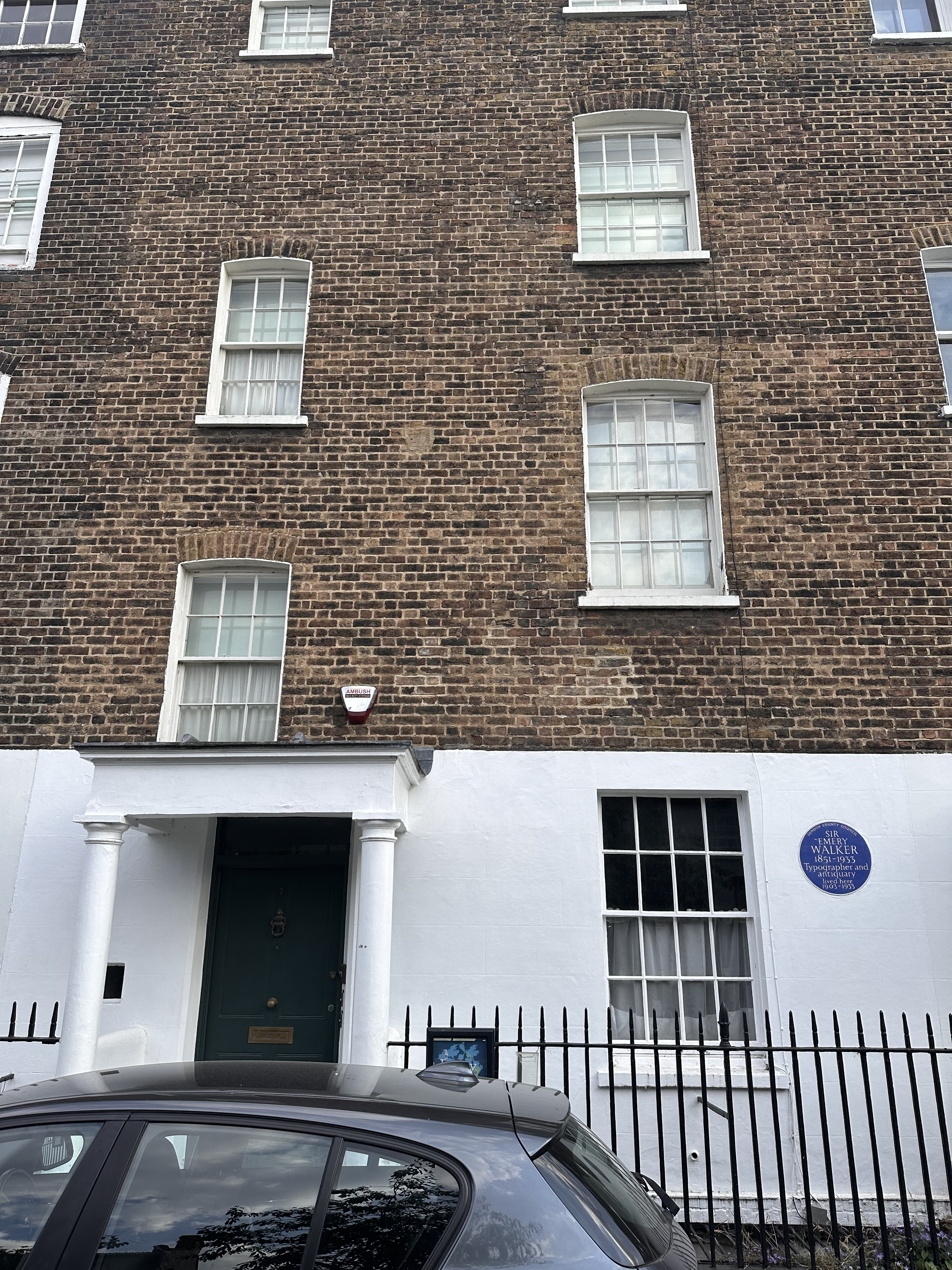
- Interactive map of the 7 Hammersmith Terrace area

General information
- Location: Hammersmith and Fulham, London, England
- Estimated completion: 1755

Website
- www.emerywalker.org.uk

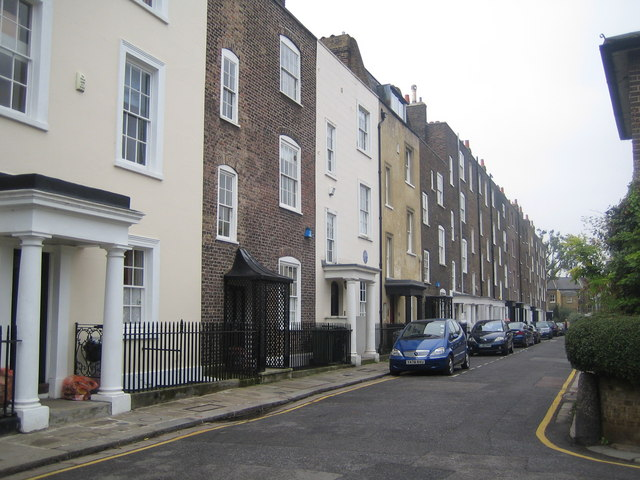
Hammersmith Terrace

7 Hammersmith Terrace is an historic house in the London Borough of Hammersmith and Fulham, England, and the former home of English engraver and printer Emery Walker. Walker was an important figure in the English Arts and Crafts movement, and a close friend of textile designer William Morris, who lived nearby. During his life, Walker furnished the home in an Arts and Crafts style, reflecting his friendships with Morris and others.

The terraced house is a Grade II* listed building. It is four storeys tall, two windows wide with a Doric porch and built of brown brick with stucco to the ground floor. A blue plaque was erected by London County Council.

After Walker's death, his daughter Dorothy sought to preserve the interior of the house, while adding further items from the Morris family. As a result of this preservation work, the house now offers a unique example of an Arts and Crafts interior, preserved almost as it was during the life of its former inhabitant.

The property is under the ownership of the Emery Walker Trust, a registered charity, who describe it as "the last authentic Arts and Crafts interior in Britain". The house may be visited through prebooked guided tours. Hammersmith Terrace is located immediately off the A4 road, west of Hammersmith Broadway.

== History ==
The seventeen houses on Hammersmith Terrace were built c. 1755, offering a cheaper alternative to more central London housing. In the late nineteenth and early twentieth centuries, the Terrace was home to several artists and creative professionals, including the actor F. G. Stephens and calligrapher Edward Johnston. Emery Walker moved into number 7 with his wife and children in 1903, having spent the previous 24 years living at 3 Hammersmith Terrace.

When Walker died in 1933, ownership of the property passed to his daughter Dorothy, who attempted to preserve the house and its contents. Upon her death in 1963, the house became the property of Dorothy's nurse-companion, Elizabeth de Hass. She followed Dorothy's attempts to preserve the house, which consequently remained in a similar state to when Walker was alive. Before her death in 1999, de Hass approached experts at various institutions, with a view to setting up a trust to continue managing the property. The Emery Walker Trust was established in February 1999, using money raised by selling print items in Walker's private collection. This Trust subsequently gained ownership of the house.

== Present day ==
The Emery Walker Trust opened the house to the public for the first time in April 2005. Initially, there were fears that financial constraints would prevent future openings, but the house offers prebooked guided tours to individuals and groups each summer since. The house has a blue plaque to commemorate the life of its former resident.

== Interior ==
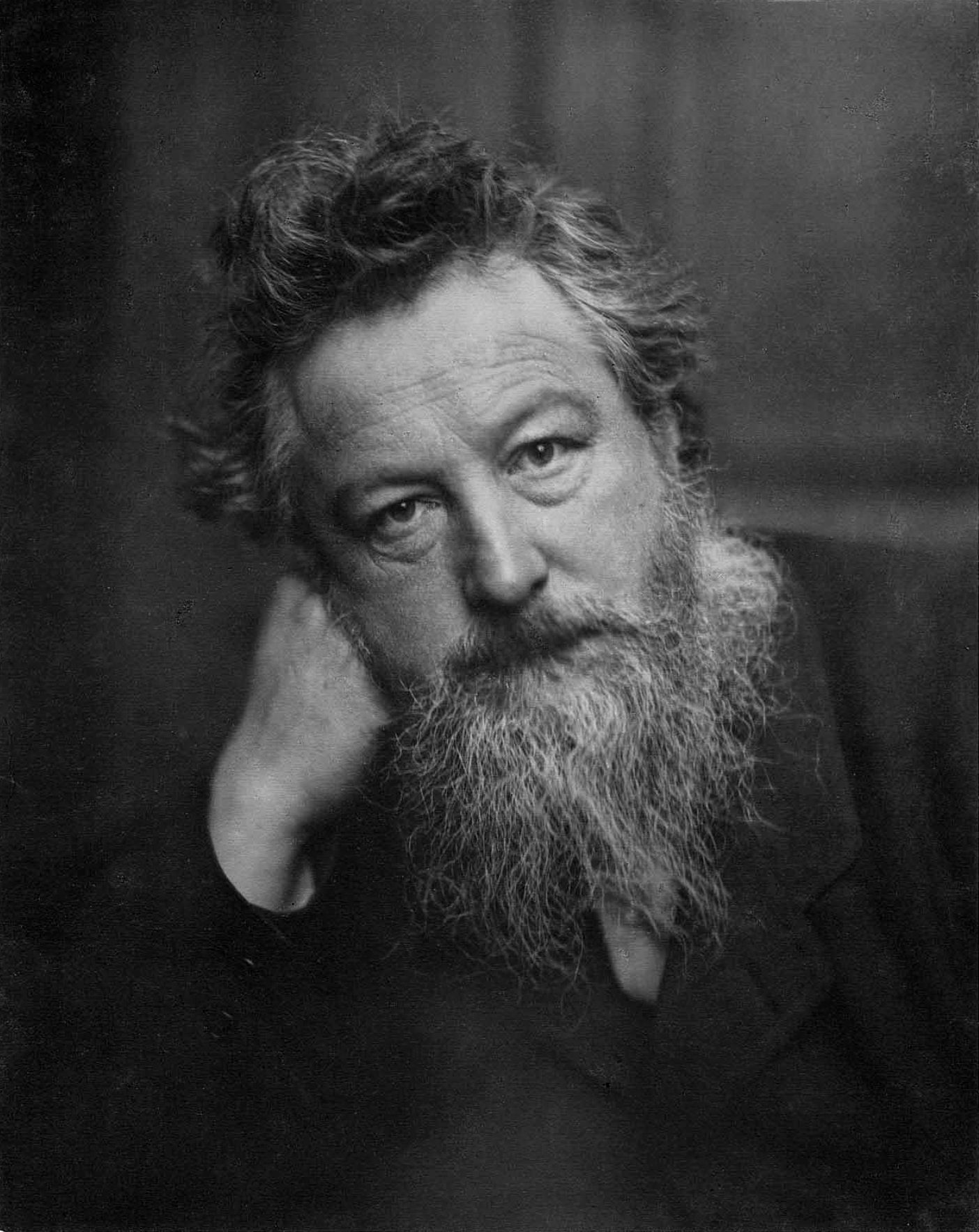
William Morris, friend of Emery Walker. Many of Morris's designs and possessions can be found inside 7 Hammersmith Terrace.

The house has an Arts and Crafts interior that has changed little since Walker resided at the property, owing to the preservation work of his daughter and her nurse-companion. In particular, the house and contents bear witness to Walker's friendship with the textile designer William Morris, who lived nearby. Walker and Morris became friends after Walker had first moved to Hammersmith Terrace, and the relationship between the families continued after Morris's death, with frequent visits to each other's homes. Morris's daughter May contributed several items to the Walker household after her father's death in 1896, whether given to Emery himself or to his daughter Dorothy when she inherited the property.

The linoleum in the entrance-way was a Morris design, and is the only known example of a Morris linoleum still in its original domestic setting. The property also features patterned wall-hangings and a blue flatweave rug from the Morris household, the latter bought by Dorothy at a house contents sale in 1939. There are also a few personal items belonging to Morris, including his spectacles and a lock of his hair.

Other items within the house also came from individuals connected with the Arts and Crafts movement. When the architect Philip Webb died, Walker inherited all of his possessions, including items of furniture that are still in the property. The drawing room of the house contains a secretaire designed by Ernest Barnsley. The house's inventory also includes documents, such as an original proof of The Earthly Paradise by Morris and letters from Rudyard Kipling, and a teapot belonging to Dante Gabriel Rossetti. Miscellaneous personal possessions of Walker's also remain in the house, including souvenirs from his voyages abroad, and his 1933 National Trust membership card.

Artworks include two oil paintings by Samuel Butler, better known as a novelist, of Soglio, Switzerland and Westminster School; Christmas Roses, an oil by Anna Hornby; and an oil painting by Neville Bulwer-Lytton, 3rd Earl of Lytton of his daughter Madeline.
