= Emery Walker =

English printer (1851–1933)

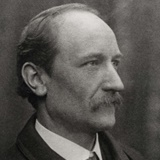
- Born: 2 April 1851
- Died: 22 July 1933 (aged 82); Hammersmith
- Occupation: Printmaker, businessperson, exlibrist
- Awards: Fellow of the Society of Antiquaries; Knight Bachelor (1930)

Sir Emery Walker FSA (2 April 1851 – 22 July 1933) was an English engraver, photographer and printer. Walker took an active role in many organisations that were at the heart of the Arts and Crafts movement, including the Art Workers Guild, the Society for the Protection of Ancient Buildings, and the Arts and Crafts Exhibition Society.

== Life ==
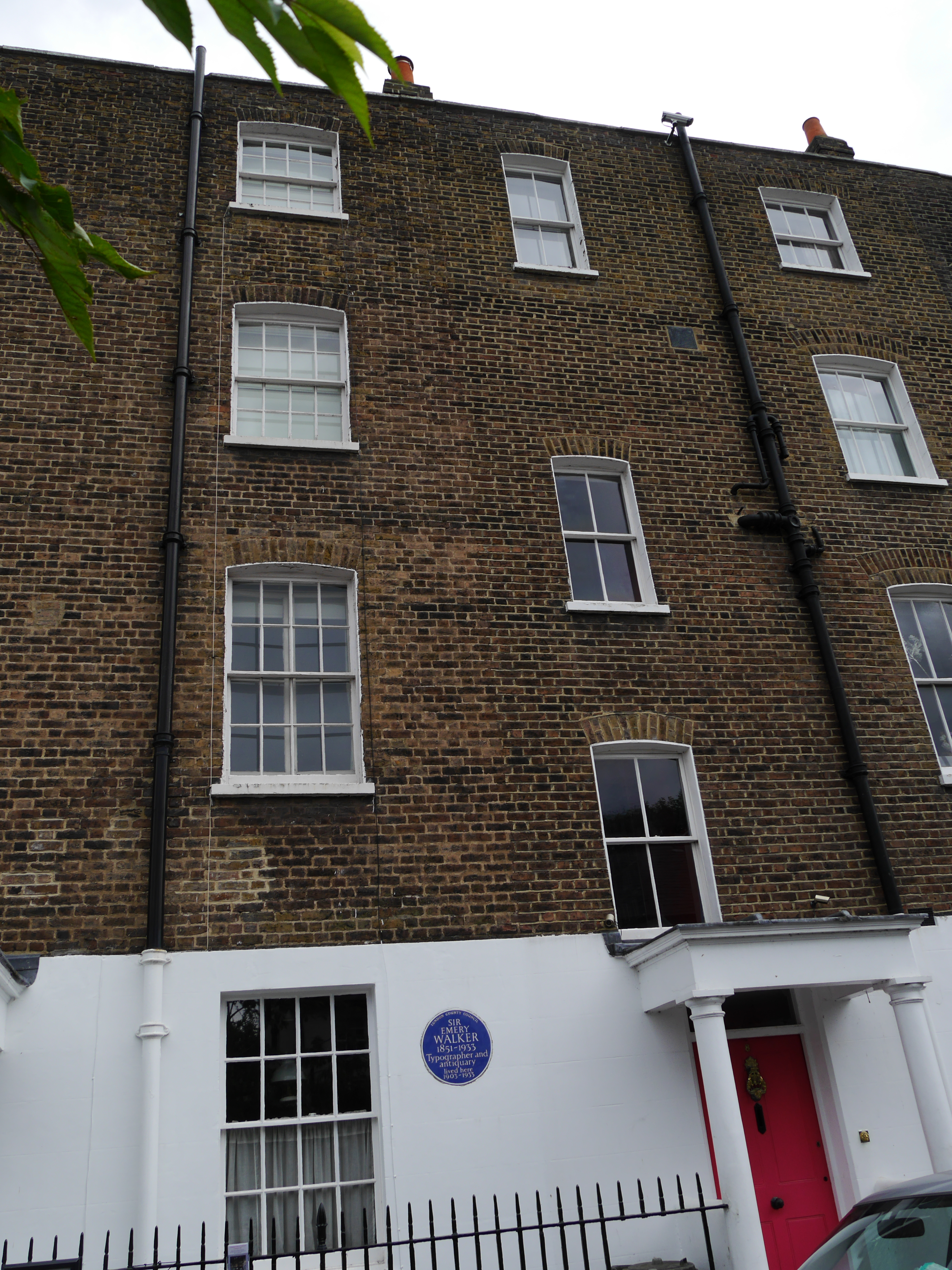
7 Hammersmith Terrace, with the blue plaque to Walker

Walker was born in London. His father was a coach builder. He obtained a very old book when he was twelve that gave him a love of books. A year later his father's failing sight meant that he had to leave school.

In the late 1870s, Walker befriended William Morris, with whom he shared both socialist beliefs and a keen interest in printing. They lived near each other. Walker's expertise and his collection of 16th-century typefaces inspired Morris to create the Kelmscott Press.

After Morris's death, Walker set up his own printing enterprise, the Doves Press, with bookbinder T. J. Cobden Sanderson which in turn inspired the private presses of the 20th century. The capital for the enterprise which was £1,600 was supplied by Anne Cobden-Sanderson. The font that they created was intended to be shared. By 1906 the partners had fallen out over Walker's low interest and T. J. Cobden-Sanderson's obsessive interest. Despite the agreement, Cobden-Sanderson did not deliver a copy of the font and instead arranged for every copy of the design to be dropped into the Thames.

In 1910, Walker photographed the Rice portrait of Jane Austen, subsequently published in the 1913 edition of Jane Austen: her life and letters, a family record by William Austen-Leigh and Richard Arthur Austen-Leigh.

In 1922 Anne Cobden-Sanderson's husband died. After his death, she paid a large sum to settle the dispute with Walker. This money was to compensate him for the loss of the Doves typeface that her husband had thrown into the Thames when his partnership with Walker ended.

"Emery Walker, Esq. Process engraver and Printer. Past Master of the Art Workers' Guild. Late President of the Arts and Crafts Exhibition Society. A Trustee of the Wallace Collection and a Fellow of the Society of Antiquaries" received a knighthood in 1930.

Walker's daughter, Dorothy Walker, and later Dorothy's live-in companion, Elizabeth de Haas, preserved many of Walker's private papers and the family collection of Arts and Crafts decorative items and ephemera at the family home at 7 Hammersmith Terrace, London. The house is now a museum run by the Emery Walker Trust, a registered charity. Emery Walker's library of private press books was sold to Cheltenham Art Gallery and Museum to endow the trust.

Walker’s three lectures for the Sandars Readership in Bibliography in 1924 were published by the Oak Knoll Press in 2019.
