= Clapham Common Northside =

Road in London, England

Coordinates: 51.4612°N 0.1519°W

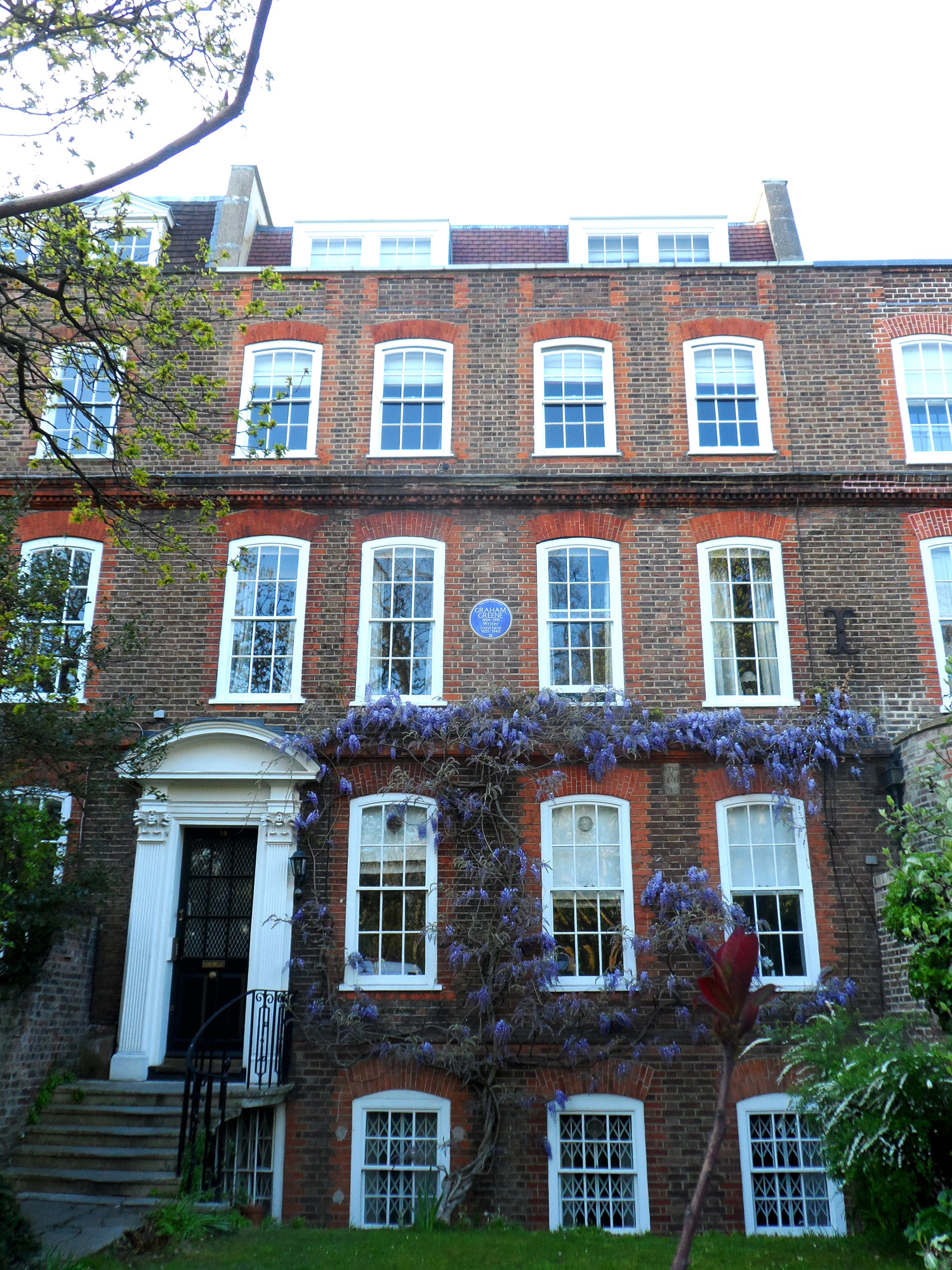
14 Clapham Common North Side

Clapham Common Northside is a road in South West London. One part of it is the A3 which leads to Portsmouth.

The 19th-century composer Edvard Grieg stayed in a hotel there while performing in London. The architect Charles Barry, who designed the Houses of Parliament, lived and died in the building which is now known as Trinity Hospice. Samuel Pepys spent the last years of his life in a house on this road. Graham Greene, the novelist, lived at 14 North Side. In 1940, a bomb destroyed Greene's Clapham house, and Greene described similar scenes in his 1943 novel of London during the Blitz, The Ministry of Fear, and later in The End of the Affair.

Opposite Northside, on Clapham Common, is Holy Trinity Church, the place of worship that was home to 'The Clapham Sect' the abolitionist group, one of whose members was William Wilberforce. The Clapham Sect was popularised in the 2006 film Amazing Grace.
