= Richard Wagener =

American wood engraver (born 1944)

Richard Wagener (born 1944) is an American wood engraver known for his prints and fine press books. His work has been collected by over one hundred and thirty public institutions. His first livre d'artiste, Zebra Noise with a Flatted Seventh, was included in Artists' Books in the Modern Era, 1870–2000 at the Legion of Honor, Fine Arts Museums of San Francisco. Victoria Dailey has called Wagener the first California artist since Paul Landacre to achieve prominence in the art of wood engraving.

== Works ==
Wagener's early engravings juxtaposed realistic elements against a field of abstract imagery, frequently incorporating letterforms. In 1990, while teaching at Kala Institute, he met Peter Rutledge Koch, fine press printer, Berkeley. California. Their collaboration resulted in the publication of Zebra Noise with a Flatted Seventh (Peter Koch, Printers, 1998). Zebra Noise included 26 wood engravings of a zoological alphabet as well as a text by Wagener that is evocative of the American West. Simon Brett, noted British engraver and writer, wrote that “No one else I know of is making such avant-garde grand opera in wood-engraved prints.” Mark Dimunation, Head of Special Collections at the Library of Congress, referred to the book as a “work of maturity and grace.”

In 1999 Wagener was elected as a member of the Society of Wood Engravers in England. This organization was started in 1920 by a group of artists including Lucien Pissarro and Eric Gill.

In 2003, Wagener contributed abstract color wood engravings to accompany The Fragments of Parmenides, Editions Koch, Berkeley. This book, some ten years in the making, features a new translation of the Parmenides fragments by Robert Bringhurst, Canadian poet, typographer and author, and uses two new Greek typefaces commissioned for this project by Peter Koch. The first typeface was designed by Christopher Stinehour in a digital format. The second typeface was cut in steel and cast in metal by Dan Carr at the Golgonooza Typefoundry in Ashuelot, New Hampshire.

In 2006, Wagener established the imprint Mixolydian Editions for his own fine press projects. The first publication was Cracked Sidewalks, vignettes and prose poems about growing up in Los Angeles. The second book was Mountains & Religion, twenty engravings based on imagery from a journey to Nepal and Tibet in 1995, published in 2011. His print Kathmandu Alley, from Mountains and Religion, is a prime example of realistic imagery informed by an abstract sensibility.

The Book Club of California published California in Relief, (2009, thirty wood engravings by Wagener with a foreword by Victoria Dailey). Peter Koch collaborated in the design and printing of this book. Jan Elsted noted: “Wagener’s essential engravings of an outer landscape remind us of the echo within ourselves of an interior one, and we respond with grateful recognition.”

In 2009 Wagener was invited to Magnolia Editions, Oakland, California, to develop large-scale woodcut interpretations of his wood engravings. Four images, two from the Sierra Nevada Mountains and two from Nepal, were published in limited editions.

Wagener has produced a number of engraved bookplates that have been collected internationally. He designed the logo for the XXVII FISAE Congress held in Boston, 2000. His bookplates have been featured in Print Magazine; Contemporary Ex-Libris Artists, article by James Keenan, published in Portugal, 2003;^{[13]} California Bookplates by Robert Dickover, published by the Book Club of California, 2006;^{[14]} and Three Centuries of the American Bookplate by James Goode, the catalog accompanying a show of bookplates at the University of Virginia in 2010.^{[15]}

In 2013 Wagener again collaborated with Peter Rutledge Koch to create a companion book, The Sierra Nevada Suite: Thirty-One Wood Engravings, published by the Book Club of California. This book continued Wagener's observations of the sometimes stark and austere details of California's landscape and featured two fold-out panoramic engravings of Yosemite. It received a Juror's Choice award at the Fine Press show in Oxford, England.

At the 2013 Codex Book Fair and Symposium held at the Craneway Pavilion, Richmond, California, Wagener met the New Zealand poet Alan Loney. After seeing Wagener's new suite of prints based on the idea of weaving, Loney agreed to write a poetic response. The resultant book, Loom, was collaboratively designed and published by David Pascoe, Nawakum Press, Santa Rosa, California and Richard Wagener, Mixolydian Editions, Petaluma, California. The text was printed by Patrick Reagh, Sebastopol, California while the engravings were printed by Wagener at Mixolydian Editions, Petaluma, California. Craig Jensen at Booklab II in San Marcos, Texas did the binding. Loom had its debut at Codex Australia Book Fair held in Melbourne, Australia during March 2014. David Pascoe made a short film about the making of this book that focuses on Wagener, the engraver, Patrick Reagh, the printer, and Craig Jensen, the bookbinder.

The development of a special print for the deluxe edition of Loom led to a small series of prints that looked at weaving from a different point of view. The series of engravings for Loom explored the idea of threads coming together into a weaving. In contrast, the new series of engravings emerged from thinking about the ultimate fate of this activity and the beauty in weathered and distressed textiles. Alan Loney subsequently wrote a poetic response to these engravings. Mixolydian Editions published the poem and the prints in a book titled Vestige. This book was entirely printed and bound using handmade paper from Twinrocker Paper, Brookston, Indiana and Papeterie St. Armand, Montreal, Canada. Lisa Van Pelt, Philo, California, bound the limited edition of the book. Vestige had its debut at the 2015 Codex Book Fair.

Edwin Dobb, independent writer and lecturer at the UC Berkeley School of Journalism, interviewed Wagener about his development as a book artist engaged in wood engraving. A highlight of this interview is an examination of the relationship between abstract and realistic imagery in his engravings. This interview was published in the Book Club of California Quarterly, Winter 2015.

Wagener created an engraving of Festival Hall from the Panama Pacific International Exposition held in San Francisco during 1915. Wagener printed the engraving for a broadside published by the Book Club of California in commemoration of the centennial of this event. The broadside was designed and printed by Fred and Barbara Voltmer and Li Jiang at Havilah Press, Emeryville, California.

Richard Wagener and David Pascoe again collaborated to create Trading Eights, The Faces of Jazz, a book of jazz portraits engraved by Jim Todd of Missoula, Montana. Also included in the book is an essay by jazz critic and musical historian Ted Gioia and a poem by his brother Dana Gioia, Poet Laureate of California, 2015-2018. Patrick Reagh did the monotype composition of the text. Lisa Van Pelt, Philo, California created the paste papers for the covers and did the binding for the edition. Mixolydian Editions and Nawakum Press published Trading Eights in 2016.

In 2016 Richard Wagener and David Pascoe were the recipients of the 15th Carl Hertzog Award for Excellence in Book Design for their book Loom, published by Nawakum Press/Mixolydian Editions 2014. This national award honors the lifework of one of this country's most accomplished book designers and printers, Carl Hertzog, 1902 -1984. The award is sponsored by the Friends of the University Library of the University of Texas at El Paso.

The Book Club of California awarded Wagener the 2016 Oscar Lewis Award for his contributions to the field of Book Arts. Past recipients of this award include Ward Ritchie, Jack Stauffacher, Peter Rutledge Koch, Patrick Reagh, Carolee Campbell, and Sandra and Harry Reese.

During a meeting in late 2015 to discuss a future book, the writer Edwin Dobb suggested that they resurrect a previously stalled project about exotic desert plants. Within two months Dobb had completed a four-thousand word essay about the origins of botanical gardens. The resultant book was Exoticum, Twenty-five Desert Plants from the Huntington Botanical Gardens published by Mixolydian Editions. John DeMerritt of Emeryville. California bound the edition using an abstract marbled paper designed by Pamela Smith of Abiquiu, New Mexico. The book was officially launched at a talk Wagener gave at the Huntington Gardens, San Marino, California in January 2017.

The 2017 Reva and David Logan Symposium on the Artist's Book was held at The Legion of Honor (museum) in San Francisco. Wagener gave a presentation on The Fabric of Collaboration. Other presenters at the symposium were Mary Ann Caws, Lisa Pearson, Kyle Schesinger, and Ward Schumaker.

John Hawk, Head Librarian of Special Collections & University Archives at the University of San Francisco, approached Wagener in December 2016 and asked him to consider writing a foreword for a book he was writing on the California wood engraver Mallette Dean. After several meetings going over the prints in the university's collection, Wagener agreed to write a short appreciation for Mallette Dean. In 2018 the Book Club of California published Mallette Dean, A Printmaker and His Art with Wagener's Foreword.

In response to a request from Peter Koch, founder of the Codex Foundation, Wagener engraved an image of Spitsbergen Island to be used with promotional material for Codex Nordica, the 2019 Codex Book Fair and Symposium. In addition, Wagener's essay After the Studio Floor is Swept was included in the Codex Papers, Volume One. Wagener also collaborated with Edwin Dobb to produce a broadside, Corrosion, that was included in Words on the Edge: an EXTRACTION Art broadside project of the Codex Foundation that included the poems and lyrical texts of twenty-six writers paired with an equivalent number of notable letterpress printers.

In the late 1970s Wagener picked up a copy of A Vegetable Emergency by Maxine Chernoff from the Beyond Baroque Literary Arts Center in Venice, California. Over time this publication began disintegrating due to its acidic paper. In 2017 he conceived the idea of letterpress printing a number of these poems accompanied by abstract color engravings from his Umbraculo Series. Working with Patrick Reagh for casting the metal type and bookbinder Craig Jensen, the book, Teapots & Tympani, was designed and printed at Mixolydian Editions and officially launched at the Codex Book Fair in 2019.

In 2019, Jan and Crispin Elsted at Barbarian Press, Mission B.C., Canada, published a major retrospective volume on Richard Wagener's engraving in their ongoing series of monographs on wood engravers: Endgrain Editions 5: Richard Wagener – a Dialogue with Wood Engraving. The book features ninety-five of Wagener's engravings from every period of his work, including several in color, all printed from the end grain blocks. The images are interspersed with prose comments by the artist and others. The book includes, by way of an introduction, a major autobiographical essay by Richard Wagener, ‘A Dialogue with Wood Engraving’, in which he traces his early exploration of art, his discovery of wood engraving, and his journey within the form.

In honor of the eightieth anniversary of the 1940 historic voyage of the Western Flyer by John Steinbeck and Edward Ricketts, Arion Press published a fine press edition of their book Sea of Cortez. It was originally published in December 1941, two days before Pearl Harbor. Ten years later the book was republished under the title The Log from the Sea of Cortez with a new preface by Steinbeck, “About Ed Ricketts.” This subsequent edition omitted Ricketts’ name from the cover giving Steinbeck sole authorship. The Arion Press edition restores Ricketts name as coauthor. Wagener contributed six wood engravings, five of marine specimens and a three-color engraving of the Western Flyer.

Nawakum Press, Gig Harbor, Washington, and Mixolydian Editions, Petaluma, California published Cascadia, a fine press book celebrating the old growth forests of the Pacific Northwest. This 2021 book featured twenty-four engravings by Richard Wagener, haiku and haibun poetry by Christopher Herold, and an essay,The Lost Forest by Pulitzer Prize winning journalist William Dietrich (novelist). This book was the subject of a talk given by Wagener at the 2022 Codex Symposium in Berkeley, California.

In 2022, Jan and Crispin Elsted at Barbarian Press published Ten Poems with One Title by Robert Bringhurst with wood engravings by Richard Wagener.

From Here and There was published by Mixolydian Editions in 2022. This book presented twenty wood engravings seen in botanical collections around the world including London, Edinburgh, Melbourne, Kretinga, Vienna, Helsinki, Costa Rica, and California. Information about the plants and the locations where they were seen accompany the engravings.

The 2024 Fine Press Book Association's Collector's Prize was awarded to Mixolydian Editions and Nawakum Press for their book A Bonsai Shaped Mind/Postures of the Heart. This book presents short essays, stories, and translated poetry by Marc P. Keane with Wagener's engravings of bonsai plants, specimens from the George Weyerhaeuser Pacific Rim Bonsai Collection at the Pacific Bonsai Museum in Federal Way, Washington.

The Book Club of California published their 243rd publication in 2024. From California presented the poetry of Dana Gioia with the engravings of Richard Wagener. The book was designed by Wagener who also printed the engravings from the original wood blocks. Norman Clayton printed the text. Cover paper was created by Rebecca Chamlee.

Wagener again teamed up with Robert Bringhurst to design In the Beginning, a contemporary, reflective look at the theme of Genesis by poet Robert Bringhurst published by Mixolydian Editions, 2025. Handmade paper for the cover was created by Heather Peters at Society of Hermits, Canyon Country, California.

Wagener's archives, 1974 - 2020, are held by the Library of Congress.

== Education ==
He studied biology at the University of San Diego and earned an MFA in painting from Art Center School, Los Angeles (now Pasadena), California.

== Notable writings ==
His interview of artist Robert Motherwell, conducted in 1974, was first published in a catalog for an exhibition Robert Motherwell in California Collections at the Otis Art Institute, Los Angeles, and later included in The Collected Writings of Robert Motherwell.

Wagener wrote an essay for Carving the Elements, a companion to The Fragments of Parmenides, discussing the development of his engravings to illuminate the text.

"After the Studio Floor is Swept", The Codex Papers, Volume One, 2018, The Codex Foundation, Berkeley, California.

"A Dialogue with Wood Engraving", Endgrain Number 5, Barbarian Press, Mission, British Columbia, 2019
