= Kate Steinitz =

American art historian

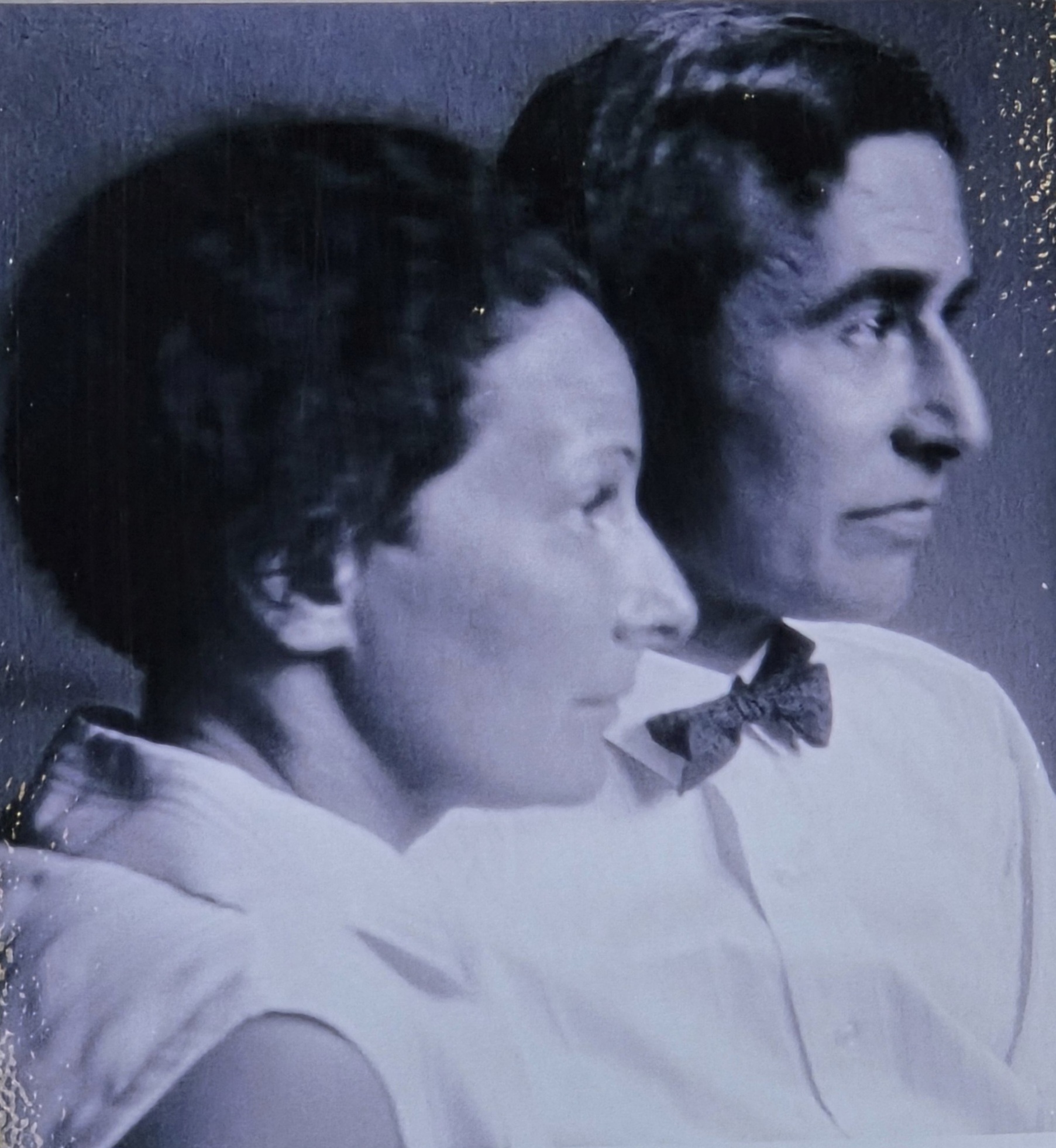
- Born: Kate (a.k.a. Käte or Käthe) Traumann; August 2, 1889; Beuthen, Upper Silesia (now Bytom, Poland)
- Died: April 7, 1975 (aged 85); Los Angeles, California
- Known for: Painting, Photography, Art history
- Movement: Dada
- Spouse: Dr. Ernst Steinitz

Kate Steinitz (2 August 1889 - 7 April 1975), informally known as “the Mama of Dada,” was a German-American artist, preserver and collector of Bauhaus and Dadaist art, promoter, and, librarian. From 1945 until her death, she served as the librarian of the Elmer Belt Library of Vinciana, first when the library was based in the collector's medical offices, and later as honorary curator when the collection was given to UCLA in 1961.

Steinitz is remembered for collaborative work with the Kurt Schwitters, and, in later life, her scholarship on Leonardo da Vinci.

== Life ==
Kate (at first called Käte or Käthe) Traumann was born into an upper-middle-class family in Beuthen, Upper Silesia (now Bytom, Poland). In 1899, her father, Judge Arnold Traumann, was transferred to Berlin, where she was educated. She attending drawing classes with Käthe Kollwitz and later the "Malschule für Frauen" (Women's Painting School) run by Lovis Corinth. She also attended the Academie und Studienateliers fuer Malerei und Plastik (connected with the Berlin Secession), the Académie de la Grande Chaumière, and the University of Paris.

In 1912 or 1913, after returning from a study visit in Paris, she married a physician, Dr. Ernst Steinitz (March 25, 1881 - February 1, 1942). With the World War I in 1914, her husband joined the army as a military physician. In 1917, he was called to the front, and in 1918 the Steinitz family, which now included daughters Ilse and Lotti, relocated to Hanover. A third daughter, Beate, was born in 1920.

Page from Die Scheuche: Märchen (The Scarecrow: A Fairytale), 1925, by Kurt Schwitters, Kate Steinitz, and Theo van Doesburg.

While in Hanover, Steinitz painted portraits of her daughters. She also drew inspiration from dancers, entertainers, and performers, frequently featuring them in her drawings and paintings. Highly involved in the local art scene, she became an active participant in the emerging Dada movement, contributing to its growth and influence.

Steinitz collaborated with her friend Kurt Schwitters on several projects, including children's books, opera librettos, books, and festivals. Together with Theo van Doesburg, Schwitters and Steinitz produced several children's fairy-tale books that featured unusual typography, including Hahnepeter (Peter the Rooster, 1924), Die Märchen vom Paradies (The Fairy Tales of Paradise, 1924–25), and Die Scheuche (The Scarecrow, 1925). For the publication of their work, the artists founded their own publishing house, which they called APOSS, an acronym that stood for "A=active; P=paradox; OS=oppose sentimentality; S=sensitive."

Steinitz also began to write for the newspaper the Hannoverscher Kurier, and for various journals by Ullstein Verlag, using her own name as well as under the pseudonyms "Annette Nobody" and "Mia Meyer."

In 1936, the Steinitz family immigrated to New York City to escape Nazi persecution, after having been told by government authorities that she could no longer write for German publications. While living in New York, Steinitz continued to paint while also contributing to the family's income through freelance commercial art and research projects. She also began working as a book scout for Jacob Zeitlin, who was helping collector Elmer Belt build his Leonardo da Vinci collection.

In 1941, Steinitz's youngest daughter Beate died in Palestine of natural causes at the age of 20. On the evening of February 1, 1942, Steinitz discovered her husband dead on the floor of his consulting room at 147 East 50th Street. He had left her a note describing a range of symptoms, which led him to conclude that he was suffering from coronary thrombosis. The note mentioned that he was in severe pain and intended to take morphine by injection to alleviate it. However, there was no mention of suicide, and the hypodermic syringe found on a nearby desk appeared unused. This led police to believe that Dr. Steinitz may have succumbed to a heart attack before he could administer the morphine.

In August 1942, Steinitz moved to San Francisco, California to be closer to her daughter Ilse.

In 1944, she became an American citizen and relocated to Los Angeles. She consulted Dr. Belt about a medical problem, and he recognized her attraction to and interest in his Leonardo collection. And though she had no formal academic credentials or training in librarianship, he appreciated her sophistication, intelligence, language skills, wide network of friendships abroad, and knowledge of art and books. Grateful to Dr. Belt for steady and fulfilling work, Steinitz threw herself into the job, transforming herself into a serious Leonardo scholar. In 1958, she published an important bibliography of the Treatise on Painting and in 1969 she was invited to deliver the annual Lettura Vinciana in Vinci, Italy, the highest honor for contributors to the field of Leonardo studies. In 1961, when the collection was transferred to UCLA, by which time she was 72, she was appointed Honorary Curator of the Elmer Belt Library of Vinciana by Librarian Lawrence Clark Powell and Chancellor Franklin D. Murphy and continued to be a regular presence in the Library.

Despite her professional turn towards scholarship, Steinitz's artistic, bohemian, and fun-loving side remained fully intact during her Los Angeles years. Both European and American art world figures called on her in her West Los Angeles apartment, where she had important work created by the artistic luminaries of her youth including El Lissitzky, Kurt Schwitters, László Moholy-Nagy, Paul Klee, Wassily Kandinsky, Auguste Rodin, Otto Nebel, Franz Marc, and others. Her friends in Los Angeles included members of the German-Jewish émigré community, contemporary innovators like Buckminster Fuller, and people across the spectrum of the art world. On the occasion of her 80th birthday in 1969, the Los Angeles County Museum of art organized an exhibition consisting of both her own work and art from her personal collection. For the opening, Steinitz wore a silver lamé sheath and a headband with antennae-like bobbling balls and declared to friends that she was “Ready for the Space Age.”

Some of Steinitz's art collection went to the Los Angeles County Museum of Art, but most of it was placed by Steinitz's daughter Ilse Berg at the Vincent Price Art Museum at East Los Angeles College.

In 1963, she published a book on Kurt Schwitters in German, with an English edition being published in 1968.

Steinitz died on April 7, 1975, Los Angeles.

In 1994, a retrospective of her work was held at Severin Wunderman Museum, a private museum in Irvine, California which existed from 1985 to 1995.

== Archival sources ==
Steinitz (Kate Traumann) Papers, (Collection 1770). UCLA Library Special Collections, Charles E. Young Research Library, University of California, Los Angeles. http://www.oac.cdlib.org/findaid/ark:/13030/c8d79hxc/admin/?query=steinitz#aspace_4eb2d304ff7b831120cd3e010da45e67 Processed and opened for research 2017–18.

A Finding Aid to the Kate Steinitz Papers, circa 1910–2002, in the Archives of American Art, Smithsonian Institution. https://sova.si.edu/record/AAA.steikate?s=90&n=10&t=C&q=Poems&i=92 Processed and opened for research 2016.

Schwitters-Steinitz Collection, National Gallery of Art in Washington, D.C libraryimage.nga.gov/doc/pdf/schwitters_steinitz.pdf Processed in 1993; with additional items purchased in 1997 and processed in 2007.
