= Carlo Pedretti =

Italian art historian (1928–2018)

- Born: 6 January 1928
- Died: 5 January 2018 (aged 89)
- Years active: 1960 – 1993
- Known for: Leonardo da Vinci scholarship

Academic work
- Discipline: Art history, History of science
- Institutions: University of California, Los Angeles

Carlo Pedretti (6 January 1928 – 5 January 2018) was an Italian art historian. In his lifetime, he was considered one of the world's leading experts on the life and works of Leonardo da Vinci. He was a professor of art history and Armand Hammer Chair in Leonardo Studies at the University of California, Los Angeles from 1960 until his retirement in 1993.

== Life ==
Carlo Pedretti was born in Bologna. By his 13th birthday Pedretti had taught himself to write left handed and read backwards as did Leonardo. Pedretti's first articles about Leonardo were published in 1944 at the age of 16.

From 1960 until his retirement in 1993, Pedretti was a professor of art history and Armand Hammer Chair in Leonardo Studies at the University of California, Los Angeles. He was instrumental in animating the Elmer Belt Library of Vinciana. He was the author of more than 60 books and 500 essays and articles in various languages. He moved to Italy in 2013 to live in the Villa di Castel Vitoni in Lamporecchio and direct the Rossana and Carlo Pedretti Foundation. He was also a regular of the cultural pages of the Corriere della Sera and de L'Osservatore Romano. In his foreword for the book Carlo Pedretti - A Bibliography of His Work On Leonardo da Vinci and The Renaissance (1944-1984), art historian Kenneth Clark states: "[Pedretti] is unquestionably the greatest Leonardo scholar of our time..."

Pedretti died on 5 January 2018, one day before his 90th birthday.

== Honors and memberships ==
The honors conferred upon Pedretti in Italy and abroad included the Gold Medal for Culture of the President of the Italian Republic in 1972, and in that same year, the Congressional Citation by the United States Congress. He was awarded honorary citizenship of the cities of Arezzo (2001) and Vinci (2008) and honorary degrees from the Universities of Ferrara (1991), Urbino (1998), Milan (Catholic, 1999), and Caen (2002). He was an honorary member of the Accademia degli Euteleti in San Miniato al Tedesco and of the Accademia Raffaello in Urbino. Pedretti was a member of the Permanent Commission for the National Edition of the Manuscripts and Drawings by Leonardo da Vinci.

== Selected bibliography ==
C. Pedretti (ed.), Leonardo Da Vinci on Painting: A Lost Book (Libro A) (Los Angeles, 1964).

C. Pedretti, Leonardo: A Study in Chronology and Style (Los Angeles, 1973).

C. Pedretti, Leonardo: The Machines (Florence, 1999) (transl. Catherine Frost).

C. Pedretti, Leonardo & Io (2008) (Autobiography in Italian)

== Sources ==
- Fischer, Ian (9 February 2007). "A Real-Life Mystery: The Hunt for the Lost Leonardo". The New York Times.
- Henneberger, Melinda (21 April 2002). "The Leonardo Cover-Up". The New York Times.
