= Elmer Belt =

American urologist, surgeon and pioneer in gender-affirming surgery

- Born: April 10, 1893; Chicago, Illinois
- Died: May 17, 1980 (aged 87); Los Angeles, California
- Education: University of California Berkeley University of California San Francisco
- Scientific career
- Fields: Urology
- Workplaces: Belt Urologic Group UCLA School of Medicine
- Academic advisors: Dr. Herbert McLean Evans Dr. George Washington Corner Dr. George Whipple Dr. Frank Hinman

Elmer Belt (April 10, 1893 – May 17, 1980) was an American urologist. He was an early practitioner of gender-affirming surgery, an advocate for the founding of UCLA School of Medicine, and a book collector known for assembling a library of research materials about Leonardo da Vinci—the Elmer Belt Library of Vinciana—which he donated to the University of California, Los Angeles between 1961-66.

== Early life and education ==
Arthur Elmer Belt was born in Chicago, Illinois, on April 10, 1893. His parents worked for the United States Postal Service. The family moved to Southern California when Belt was nine. Elmer Belt (the form of name he preferred) received his early education in Orange County, California, and attended Los Angeles High School, traveling there on horseback. During high school he took courses in Latin, a medical school prerequisite, and met Ruth Smart, whom he married in 1918. Belt started a small book-and-supplies store at the school. This enterprise led him to become acquainted with some of the city's leading booksellers, including Ernest Dawson. Recounting his high school years in a 1979 letter, Belt wrote, "As a Freshman in High School, I learned what an Aldine was and about Gutenberg and his woes and all of the wonderful world of books.

When he was a teenager, Belt's father died after undergoing abdominal surgery. When the surgeon informed the family, Belt noticed the smell of alcohol on him and believed the surgeon had botched the surgery while under the influence. This experience led Belt to vow never to drink alcohol. Belt attended the University of California, Berkeley, obtaining a B.A. in 1916 and an M.A. in 1917. (He was a member of the first class taught by Herbert McLean Evans.) Belt then attended UCSF School of Medicine, where he was chosen to be a fellow of the Hooper Institute for Medical Research, working in urology with Dr. George Whipple and Dr. Frank Hinman.

After completing medical school in 1920, Belt began a residency in Urology under Dr. Hinman. However, when Belt's young son, Charles, was seriously injured in a car accident, Belt sought treatment for him from renowned orthopedist Robert W. Lovett at Harvard Medical School. To be closer to his son and provide better care, Belt applied for a residency in General Surgery at the Peter Bent Brigham Hospital and spent a year working under Harvey Cushing.)

While in medical school, Belt took a non-credit elective course in the History of Medicine taught by George W. Corner. It was during this class that Belt developed his lifelong interest in Leonardo da Vinci.

== Career ==
In 1923, Elmer and Ruth Belt moved to Los Angeles, where he began a private practice. In 1936 he established the Elmer Belt Urologic Group, located in its own building at 1893 Wilshire Boulevard. The second floor of the building housed Belt's growing library. During this time, his growing reputation in the field earned him positions as a staff, attending, or consulting urologist at numerous hospitals in Los Angeles County.

Elmer Belt was a urologist and medical bibliophile, who played a role in the early history of transgender medical care in the United States in the mid-twentieth century. Historian Howard Chiang discusses Belt’s involvement in the case of “Agnes,” a transgender woman whose treatment proved pivotal to discussions on gender-affirming surgery in the 1950s and 1960s. Belt was part of larger conversations around castration, surgical ethics, and access to care at a time when transgender medicine was still very controversial. More recent scholarship argues that Belt’s role was more complicated than earlier historical interpretations have suggested. Belt did not act as a medical pioneer, but rather in a contested medical field, one shaped by institutional gatekeeping and evolving ideas of gender identity. Historians like Joanne Meyerowitz and Susan Stryker situate Belt's work within the context of the larger development of transsexual medicine in the postwar United States.

In addition to specializing in urology, Belt was an advocate for public health and, from 1939 through 1954, served as the President of the State Board of Public Health. First appointed to this position by California Governor Culbert Olsen, Belt was reappointed by Governor Earl Warren for each of the latter's three terms in office. In public health, Belt worked to establish the Hyperion Water Reclamation Plant. He also advocated for the care and rights of refugees from the Dust Bowl who had settled in Tulare County. During World War II, he advocated for funding to treat sexually transmitted diseases and to address prostitution, which he viewed as significant issues near military camps in the state.

Belt was the author of numerous publications about both urology and Leonardo da Vinci

== Role in the establishment of the UCLA School of Medicine ==
From the time he returned to California from Massachusetts in 1923, Belt advocated for the establishment of a medical school at UCLA. Despite his rising status and influence, Belt's efforts were hindered by the economic and political upheavals of the Great Depression and World War II. However, in 1945, after the war, he launched a lobbying campaign with the State Legislature's Appropriations Committee. As Governor Earl Warren’s personal physician, Belt seized the opportunity during a consultation to passionately advocate for the establishment of a medical school under UCLA’s administration. Before leaving Belt's office, Warren pulled out a notebook and outlined a ten-step plan to move the project forward and secure approval from the state legislature. For the final step, he wrote, "Be there to stand behind me when I sign this legislation." On February 19, 1946, Belt stood alongside other dignitaries as Governor Warren signed a bill allocating $7 million to establish a medical school at UCLA.

After the approval of a medical school for UCLA, the next challenge was determining its location—on-campus or off-campus. The Regents' committee on location concluded that no suitable on-campus site was available. Concerned that the school might be placed far away, possibly at the county hospital downtown, Belt took it upon himself to scout Westwood, Los Angeles for viable land. He identified a nearly vacant 33-acre tract stretching from Wilshire Boulevard to Strathmore Drive and from the western edge of Westwood Village to Veteran Avenue.

Dr. Belt consulted Dr. Edward Janss, the developer who had donated the land for UCLA’s campus, and discovered the property was owned by the Veterans Hospital Association. Securing the land would require an act of Congress, which meant drafting a bill to transfer ownership to the University of California. However, the university’s central administration was reluctant to make the request. After persistent efforts, UCLA Chancellor Clarence Dykstra finally agreed to facilitate the transfer with the Veterans Hospital Administration.

The bill reached the 81st Congress as the final item on the docket. At this critical juncture, Dr. Belt sought the help of Edwin W. Pauley. Belt didn’t know Pauley personally, he reached out through Pauley’s wife, who arranged a meeting at their home. After hearing Dr. Belt’s appeal, Pauley called President Truman directly and persuaded him to sign the legislation. This act secured the land transfer from the Veterans Administration to the University of California, paving the way for the medical school’s construction.

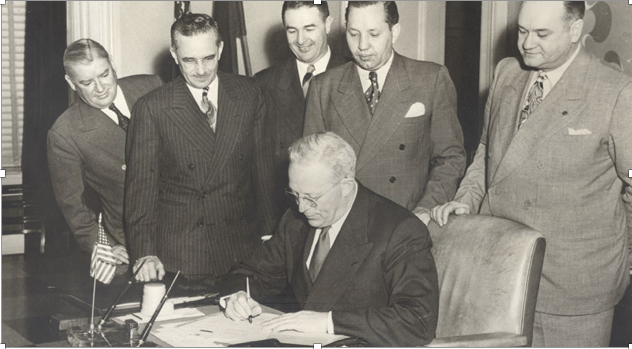
Governor Earl Warren signing the Appropriations Bill Funding the UCLA School of Medicine, 1946, with Elmer Belt second from left

Belt helped recruit the School of Medicine's first dean, Stafford L. Warren, who was appointed in 1947. In the fall of 1951, the medical school enrolled its first class, which consisted of 30 students—28 men and two women. At this time, there were 15 faculty members, including Belt, who served as Clinical Professor of Surgery (Urology). In 1955 the university completed work on the UCLA Medical Center, giving the Medical School a permanent home. Not long afterwards, University of California President Robert Gordon Sproul characterized Belt as "The Life Belt of the UCLA Medical School." Belt remained a staunch supporter of the School for the rest of his life.

== Gender-affirming surgery ==
Belt may have been the first surgeon in the United States to perform gender-affirming surgery, which he was likely doing by 1950. However, ascertaining exactly when he did them is not possible because a fire in Belt's medical office in 1958 destroyed many, if not all, records prior to that year. The surgeries were performed at Good Samaritan Hospital, where Belt's Urologic Group's surgical practice was conducted; he did not perform them at UCLA.

Belt was the uncle of Willard Elmer Goodwin, M.D. (1915-1998) who, in 1951, was the founding chair of the Division of Urology in the Department of Surgery at the UCLA School of Medicine. Belt trained his nephew in the techniques of gender-affirming surgery. In 1954 a committee of UCLA doctors, including Goodwin and members of the Psychiatry Department, decided that these surgeries should no longer be performed under the aegis of the university. However, Goodwin continued to perform them quietly. At the end of 1954, Belt temporarily ceased his transgender surgeries, but resumed them in the late 1950s.

Belt received referrals from Harry Benjamin; Dr. LeMon Clark, professor of Gynecology at the University of Arkansas and editor of Sexology Magazine; and others. Many prospective corresponded directly with Belt.

Belt performed male-to-female operations. One of his best known patients was Patricia Morgan.

In early 1962, facing pressure from his wife, his son Bruce, and his office manager, Belt decided to stop performing gender-affirming surgery. Along with these pressures, he feared the risk of a lawsuit from a dissatisfied patient that could jeopardize his practice. Additionally, it was becoming increasingly difficult to find hospitals willing to accommodate gender-affirming surgeries. Knowing that other doctors, such as Goodwin and Georges Burou, could take on these patients, Belt ultimately chose to refer them elsewhere.

== Book and manuscript collecting ==
A lifelong bibliophile, Belt began collecting books as a child. By his mid-teens, he had assembled a prized collection of comic books and dime novels. Belt's mother discarded the collection when he went to college—a loss he lamented for the rest of his life.

Belt also collected works by his patient Upton Sinclair and, in 1934, supported Sinclair's campaign for governor of California. Belt donated his Upton Sinclair collection to Occidental College Library.

In addition, Belt formed collections around Silas Weir Mitchell and Florence Nightingale. He donated both collections to the Louise M. Darling Biomedical Library at UCLA.

In 2014 the remainder of Belt's collection was sold at auction including an illuminated manuscript by Dante Gabriel Rossetti of The Blessed Damozel by Alberto Sangorski; California mission etchings by Henry Ford; a handwritten manuscript by Bertrand Russell and a signed Sierra Nevada: The John Muir Trail by Ansel Adams.

=== The Elmer Belt Library of Vinciana ===
Exhibit cases in the Elmer Belt Library of Vinciana.

Interior of the Elmer Belt Library of Vinciana.

Belt’s Leonardo da Vinci collection was his most significant undertaking as a collector, with the goal of creating the world’s most comprehensive collection on Leonardo.His efforts focused on acquiring facsimiles of Leonardo’s works in all available editions, as well as books that Leonardo is known to have consulted, specifically in the same editions that the artist himself used—an assemblage referred to as "Leonardo’s Library." He also collected early art history books, including key works like Lives of the Most Excellent Painters, Sculptors, and Architects, as well as modern scholarly literature exploring Leonardo’s influence in the arts and sciences. Among the highlights of his collection were all printed editions of A Treatise on Painting, two manuscript versions predating the first printed edition, and a selection of graphic arts materials, such as prints inspired by Leonardo’s "grotesques." Beginning in the 1930s, Dr. Belt worked closely with Jacob Zeitlin, who acted as Belt's agent in sourcing and acquiring materials for this collection.

By 1945, the Leonardo collection had grown to the extent that Belt hired a full-time librarian, his former patient Kate Steinitz, to manage it.

Incunabula in the Elmer Belt Library of Vinciana.

In installments between 1961 and 1966, Belt donated his Leonardo da Vinci collection to UCLA on the condition that the University maintain his collection and not integrate it with the rest of the library's holdings. In 2011, a fiftieth anniversary tribute to Belt was held at the Department of Special Collections. From 1966 to 2002, the Elmer Belt Library of Vinciana was housed in a suite of rooms within the Art Library in Dickson Art Center. The wood-paneled rooms were furnished with Renaissance furniture, antiques, artwork, and art objects donated by the Kress Foundation and Norton Simon. In 2002, counter to the terms of the gift, the Elmer Belt Library of Vinciana was integrated into UCLA Library Special Collections.

== Personal life ==
Belt married the former Mary Ruth Smart (1892-1983) in 1918. Like her husband, Ruth (her preferred name), attended the University of California, Berkeley. After graduating, she attended a full-time program in library science organized by the University Library and offered under the College of Letters and Science. After they settled permanently in Los Angeles in 1923, she became a social and cultural leader in the city. She served on the Los Angeles Library Commission and the Opera Guild of Southern California. She also was president of the UCLA Art Council and helped launch major fundraising events for that group. In 1959, she led a drive to add 35 cents for the city tax rate to help support the city's public elementary schools. She was as well a founding director of the World Affairs Council and national vice president of the Travelers Aid Society. She died on January 9, 1983.

The Belts had two sons, Charles Elmer Belt (1919-1994), and Bruce Gregory Belt (1926-2012), who also became a urologist, practicing medicine in the Elmer Belt Urological Group for 20 years before leaving medicine in 1977 to teach at the Brentwood School.

Belt's sister Olive married Willard Goodwin, Sr. Their son Willard Goodwin, M.D. (1915-1998), was founding chair of the Division of Urology in the Department of Surgery at the UCLA School of Medicine. Like his uncle, Goodwin performed gender-affirming surgeries. He was also known for his work in organ and graft transplantation.

The Belt Residence was located at 2201 Fern Dell Place in Los Feliz, California. Not long after suffering a stroke, Belt died on May 17, 1980, at age 87.

== Awards and honors ==
- 1951: honorary Phi Beta Kappa key
- 1952: Italian Silver Star of Solidarity
- 1962: honorary Doctor of Laws degree, University of California, Los Angeles
- 1964: University Service Award, University of California Alumni Association
- 1967: President, Society for the History of Technology
- 1972: Sir Thomas More Medal for Book Collecting, University of San Francisco
- 1976: American Urologic Association, for contributions to the History of Urology and to the Forum
- 1977: Aesculapian Award, University of California, Los Angeles School of Medicine

== Archival sources ==
- Elmer Belt Papers 1920-1980, bulk 1958-1978. Louise M. Darling Biomedical Library History and Special Collections for the Sciences, University of California, Los Angeles. Opened for research 2010. http://www.oac.cdlib.org/findaid/ark:/13030/kt2199r6k1/admin/?query=Belt%20(Elmer)%20papers#acqinfo-1.2.6
  - Note: the papers contain very little prior to 1958. In that year, a fire in Belt's medical offices seem destroyed almost everything dated earlier than 1958. in addition, access is restricted for some materials owing to patient or legal confidentiality protocols.
- Elmer Belt Papers. Library Special Collections, Charles E. Young Research Library, UCLA. Unprocessed collection. 286 boxes.
- The Harry Benjamin Collection, Library and Special Collections, The Kinsey Institute for Research in Sex, Gender and Reproduction, Indiana University, Bloomington. http://webapp1.dlib.indiana.edu/findingaids/view?brand=general&docId=VAC1594&chunk.id=d1e76&startDoc=1
- Willard E. Goodwin papers, 1915-1998, bulk 1915-1998. Library Special Collections, Charles E. Young Research Library, UCLA. Opened for research 2007. http://www.oac.cdlib.org/findaid/ark:/13030/kt367nd8mf/?query=Goodwin+(Willard+E.)+papers
- Robert J. Stoller Papers, 1942-1991. Library Special Collections, Charles E. Young Research Library, UCLA. http://www.oac.cdlib.org/findaid/ark:/13030/tf5s2006mg/admin/?query=Robert%20Stoller#descgrp-1.8.2

== Digital sources ==
- Dr.Elmer Belt Tate.
- The Elmer Belt Library of Vinciana Internet Archive.
- Elmer Belt collection of Vinciana graphic arts. Online Archive of California.
- Zagria. A Gender Variance Who's Who. https://zagria.blogspot.com/2019/03/elmer-belt-1893-1980-urologist-pioneer.html

== Printed sources ==
Arthur, Ransom. By the Old Pacific's Rolling Water: Birth of the UCLA School of Medicine. Los Angeles: School of Medicine, University of California, 1992.

Belt, Elmer. "Elmer Belt." In There Was Light: Autobiography of a University, Berkeley: 1868-1968, edited by Irving Stone, 353-367. New York: Doubleday, 1970.

Marmor, Max. "The Elmer Belt Library of Vinciana." The Book Collector, 38, no. 3 (Autumn 1989): 1-23.

Meyerowitz, Joanne. How Sex Changed: A History of Transsexuality in the United States. Cambridge, MA: Harvard University Press, 2002.

Pedretti, Carlo. Leonardo da Vinci: Studies for a Nativity and the 'Mona Lisa Cartoon' with Drawings after Leonardo from the Elmer Belt Library of Vinciana: Exhibition in Honour of Elmer Belt, M.D. on the Occasion of his Eightieth Birthday. Los Angeles: University of California, 1973.

Surgeon and Bibliophile: Elmer Belt. Oral History Transcript; interviewed by Esther de Vécsey between 1974-75. Los Angeles: Oral History Program, University of California, Los Angeles, 1983.

Chiang, Howard. “Hide and Seek: Elmer Belt, Agnes, and the Battle over Castration in Transsexual Surgery, 1953–1962.” Bulletin of the History of Medicine (2024).

Stryker, Susan. Transgender History (2017).

== Notes ==
- Stanley Brosman, urologist and close friend of Elmer Belt, supplied personal memories about Elmer Belt that added to the accuracy of this entry. Interview on February 8, 2021.
- Arthur Schapiro, urologist, colleague, and friend of Elmer Belt, also supplied, through numerous exchanges between 2019 and 2021, supplied much critical information and help in creating this entry.
