= Book Club of California =

Club that collects and prints fine books

Coordinates: 37.7899°N 122.4059°W

- Formation: 1912
- Type: Nonprofit
- Headquarters: San Francisco, CA
- Fields: Rare books and fine press works about California and the West
- Members: 800 (2016)
- Website: Official website

The Book Club of California is a non-profit membership organization of bibliophiles based in San Francisco, operating continuously since 1912. Its mission is to support the history and art of the book, including fine printing related to the history and literature of California and the western states of America through research, publishing, public programs, and exhibitions. It is one of the few book collectors' clubs in the United States with a clubhouse.

== Early history ==
The genesis of the organization was an idea for including an exhibit of rare books and fine printing in the Panama Pacific International Exposition to take place in San Francisco in 1915. Edward Robeson Taylor, John Henry Nash, W. R. K. Young and James D. Blake approached Charles Moore, the president of the exposition, with the idea in 1912, to create an organization, which gathered 58 charter members by December 1912. The original purpose of the Book Club of California was "the study of letters and the promotion of the arts pertaining to the production of books." The proposed exhibition did not take place, but the club did launch a publication program under the leadership of Albert M. Bender. Its first book publication was Robert A. Cowan's Bibliography of the History of California and the Pacific West, which appeared in 1914 as a 350-page book, printed on handmade paper by Taylor, Nash and Taylor in an edition of 250. The club also has one of the largest collections of early San Francisco printers Robert and Edwin Grabhorn, who through the Grabhorn Press started to publish books for the Club in 1921 before shutting its doors in 1965. The Allen Press is another famous printer contracted to publish works sponsored by the Club.

The club had 800 members in 1958, 850 members in 1970 and 950 in 1977 all while maintaining a waiting list.

== Publications ==
In 1970, Ruth Teiser writing in the San Francisco Examiner called the club the greatest patron of fine printers in California. The club continues to publish limited edition fine press books, using letterpress printing and emphasizing design and craftsmanship. The club is the only association in America that has continually published fine press books since 1914. The subject matter relates to the history and culture of California and sometimes other Western areas. The book authors, often club members, include historians, scholars, professional writers, and poets. In most cases, this represents the first and only appearance of their texts in printed form. As of 2015, the club had published 233 books.

Since 1933 the club has also published a quarterly newsletter and annual keepsakes.

In 1958, the club published its 100th book entitled "The Hundredth Book" which documented the history of the club thus far. A San Francisco Chronicle review said the club continued its focus on "graphic art" with "first-rate historical and literary scholarship."

== Library, exhibits, and programs ==
The club's Albert Sperisen Library holds approximately 12,000 volumes, searchable via an online catalog, and is open to the public. The collections focus on rare books about the history of books and printing as well as California and the West. The club presents exhibitions with its author talks, receptions and other events traditionally falling on Monday night. KQED described the library as having 'sound-cancelling carpets' and 'overstuffed couches' while Angela Hill found a fireplace, leather chairs and a bar. The club has had over 10 different locations since its founding.

Most bibliophile clubs do not maintain a clubhouse and a library as the Book Club of California does, with some other notable exceptions including the Grolier Club, the Rowfant Club of Cleveland and The Club of Odd Volumes.

== Prominent members ==
Well-known members of the club have included Ansel Adams, Merle Armitage, Faith Baldwin, Witter Bynner, Francis P. Farquhar, Phoebe Apperson Hearst, Alfred A. Knopf, Florence Lundborg, Stanley Marcus, Franklin D. Murphy, A. Edward Newton, Lawrence Clark Powell, Aurelia Henry Reinhardt, Ward Ritchie, Norton Simon, and Kevin Starr.

== Awards ==
In 1993, the club established the Oscar Lewis Award for achievement in Western history and the book arts.

In 1996, the American Printing History Association institutional award went to the Book Club for contributions to the understanding of printing history.

== See also ==
- Arion Press
