= Jane Bissell Grabhorn =

American typographer, bookbinder, and printer

- Grabhorn in 1954
- Born: Martha Jane Bissell; June 29, 1911; San Francisco, California, U.S.
- Died: October 1, 1973; San Francisco, California, U.S.
- Known for: Typography, bookbinding, fine printing
- Notable work: A Typografic Discourse for the Distaff Side of Printing, a Book by Ladies; Kamehameha, King of the Hawaiian Islands; McTeague: A Story of San Francisco; The Compleat Jane Grabhorn: A Hodgepodge of Typographic Ephemera
- Spouse: Robert Grabhorn

Jane Bissell Grabhorn (1911–1973) was an American artist, typographer, bookbinder, and printer.

== Early life ==
Martha Jane Bissell was born June 29, 1911, in San Francisco. Educated in France, where she learned bookbinding, she returned to California as a teenager and became a student of Belle McMurtry Young, a prominent bookbinder. In 1932 she married Robert Grabhorn.

== Career ==
Beginning in 1934 Grabhorn acquired substantial knowledge of typography and printing through working at the Grabhorn Press, which was owned and operated by her husband and his brother Edwin. In 1937 Grabhorn established her own imprint, the Jumbo Press, which she used as a vehicle for experimentation and artistic expression. Named for a toy press, most of the products of the Jumbo Press were pieces of ephemera and displayed Grabhorn's wit and interest in lighthearted feminist satire. Her best-known work for the Jumbo Press was the treatise A Typografic Discourse for the Distaff Side of Printing, a Book by Ladies (1937), which was included in the compilation Bookmaking on the Distaff Side, a collaborative feminist work by Grabhorn, Edna Beilenson, Bruce Rogers, and others. Grabhorn also wrote, illustrated, and published via the Jumbo Press A Guide & Handbook for Amateurs of Printing (1937).

Grabhorn founded the Colt Press (1938–1942) in San Francisco with William M. Roth and Jane Swinerton. The press focused primarily on subjects related to California. Notable publications include their first, Lola Montez: The Mid-Victorian Bad Girl in California, by Oscar Lewis (1938); Kamehameha, King of the Hawaiian Islands, by Marie Louise Burke (1939), which was chosen as one of the fifty "Books of the Year" by the American Institute of Graphic Arts; and McTeague: A Story of San Francisco, by Frank Norris (1941). Grabhorn set the type for the press and worked without pay during most of this period. Although she attempted to continue operating the Colt Press single-handedly after Roth left to join the Office of War Information in 1942, the press was forced to close. Grabhorn then returned to work for the Grabhorn Press, where she was able to produce 15 additional titles under the Colt Press imprint. At the Grabhorn Press she oversaw the bindery until it closed in 1965. She continued typesetting, her preferred avocation, for the rest of her life. She also continued to produce Jumbo Press publications throughout her life, many of which are compiled in The Compleat Jane Grabhorn: A Hodge-Podge of Typographic Ephemera, which she produced with her husband and Andrew Hoyem at the Grabhorn-Hoyem Press in 1968.

Jane Grabhorn died on October 1, 1973, in San Francisco.
