= Horace Gregory =

American poet (1898–1982)

Horace Gregory (April 10, 1898 in Milwaukee, Wisconsin – March 11, 1982 in Shelburne Falls, Massachusetts) was an American poet, translator of classic poetry, literary critic and college professor. He was awarded the Bollingen Prize in 1965.

== Life ==
A graduate of the University of Wisconsin in 1923, he was the author of eight books of poems. He translated poems by the Roman poets Catullus and Ovid, and wrote biographies of Whistler and Amy Lowell. In 1925, he married poet and editor Marya Zaturenska (Pulitzer Prize winner for poetry, 1938; 1902–1982). They had two children: Patrick Bolten Gregory and Joanna Elizabeth Zeigler née Gregory.

His collected essays, Spirit of Time and Place, were published in 1973. He wrote book reviews that were published in The New York Times. His work appeared in The New Yorker, Contemporary Poetry, The Wisconsin Literary Magazine, and Poetry Magazine.

Gregory's poetry has been described as "literary" and as "exhibit[ing] an awareness of the lives of working people, sometimes taking the form of the elegiac monologue." Poet Richard Eberhart said: "The ruthlessness of the city used to be his interest; he used to depict realistic characters and situations within it. Now there is the general serenity, poise and lyrical concern with language." He added: "Gregory is lyrical and straight-forward in these poems." Edgar Johnson, biographer of Charles Dickens and Sir Walter Scott among others, said that "Mr. Gregory is not one of those scholar-critics who write only for other scholar-critics. He is a scholar without pedantry, who concentrates not on exhibitionism but illumination."

Gregory was a professor of English at Sarah Lawrence College for 26 years, from 1934 to 1960, when he became Professor Emeritus. One of his students was future children's poet Myra Cohn Livingston.

He and Marya Zaturenska attended a 1948 reception at the Gotham Book Mart for Edith Sitwell. During the end of his life, Gregory and his wife were residents of Palisades, Rockland County, New York.

His papers are at Syracuse University.

== Awards ==
- 1942 Russell Loines Memorial Fund Poetry Award
- 1961 Academy of American Poets Fellowship
- 1965 Bollingen Prize

== Works ==
=== Poetry ===
- Chelsea Rooming House (Covici, Friede; 1930)
- No Retreat (Harcourt, Brace & Co.; 1933)
- Chorus for Survival (Covici, Friede; 1935)
- Fortune for Mirabel, 1941
- Poems, 1930-1940 (Harcourt, Brace & Co.; 1941)
- The Triumph of Life: Poems of Consolation for the English-Speaking World, 1943
- The Door in the Desert (1951)
- Medusa in Gramercy Park (Macmillan; 1961)
- Collected Poems (Holt, Rinehart and Winston, 1964)
- Another Look (Holt, Rinehart and Winston; 1976)

=== Criticism ===
- Pilgrim of the Apocalypse: a critical study of D.H. Lawrence. The Viking Press. 1933.
- The Shield of Achilles: essays on beliefs in poetry. Harcourt, Brace. 1944.
- A History of American Poetry, 1900-1940. Harcourt, Brace and company. 1947.
- Amy Lowell: portrait of the poet in her time. T. Nelson. 1958.
- The World of James McNeill Whistler. Nelson. 1959.
- The Dying Gladiators, and other essays. Grove Press. 1961.
- Dorothy Richardson: An Adventure in Self-Discovery. Holt, Rinehart and Winston. 1967.

=== Translations ===
- Gaius Valerius Catullus (1931). The poems of Catullus. Covici-Friede.
- Ovid (2001) [1958]. The Metamorphoses. Signet Classic. ISBN 978-0-451-52793-6.
- Love Poems of Ovid (1964)
