= Patricia Morgan (transgender woman) =

American transgender pioneer

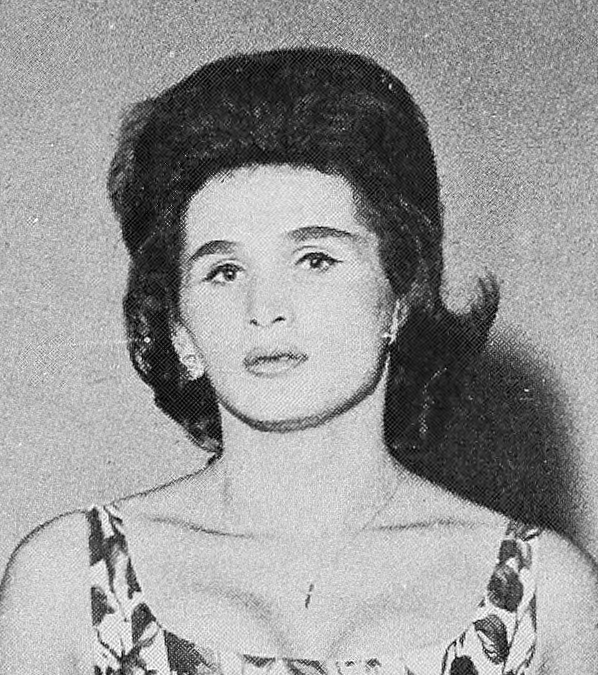
- Patricia Morgan, 1963
- Born: March 12, 1939; Jersey City, New Jersey
- Known for: Early recipient of gender reassignment surgery

Patricia Anne Morgan (also known as Patricia Anne Glavocich, born 12 March 1939 – died 1986?) was an American businesswoman and former sex worker who became, in the early 1960s, one of the earliest people to undergo gender reassignment surgery in the United States.

Morgan moved to New York at the age of 15 or 16 and after around 4 years of living there, was sentenced to 3 years in prison for assault and theft. Her gender reassignment surgeries took place in 1961/1962.

She was one of the patients of the pioneering surgeon Elmer Belt. In 1973, she published her autobiography, The Man-Maid Doll, in which she describes her experience of early experimental surgery in detail.

Morgan later started a chauffeur company, the Bunny Limousine Service, which ran for about a year. She was also offered a show in Greenwich Village, but declined.
