= Stafford L. Warren =

American physician and radiologist

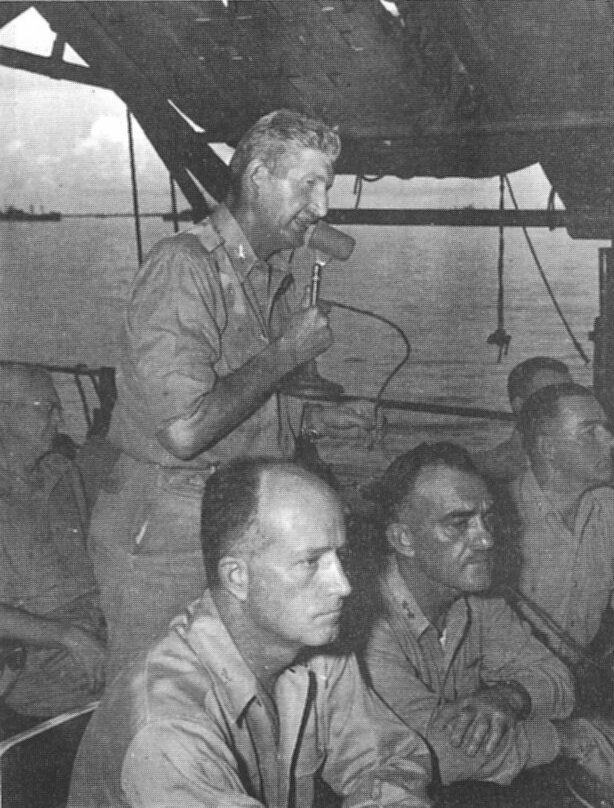
- Colonel Stafford L. Warren (with microphone) at Operation Crossroads, 1946

Dean of UCLA School of Medicine
- In office 1947–1962
- Preceded by: none
- Succeeded by: Sherman Mellinkoff

Personal details
- Born: July 19, 1896 Maxwell, New Mexico, US
- Died: July 26, 1981 (aged 85) Pacific Palisades, California, US
- Education: University of California, Berkeley (BA); University of California, San Francisco (MD)
- Awards: Army Distinguished Service Medal; Legion of Merit

Military service
- Allegiance: United States of America
- Branch/service: US Army Medical Corps
- Years of service: 1943–1947
- Rank: Colonel
- Unit: Manhattan Engineer District
- Battles/wars: World War II: Occupation of Japan

Stafford Leak Warren (July 19, 1896 – July 26, 1981) was an American physician and radiologist who was a pioneer in the field of nuclear medicine and best known for his invention of the mammogram. Warren developed the technique of producing stereoscopic images of the breast with X-rays while working in the Department of Radiology at the University of Rochester School of Medicine.

Warren was commissioned as a colonel in the United States Army Medical Corps in 1943 and appointed Chief of the Medical Section of the Manhattan Engineering District. He was responsible for the health and safety of the thousands of personnel involved in the Manhattan Project. He was present at the Trinity nuclear test in Alamogordo, New Mexico, where he was responsible for the safety aspects of the detonation of the world's first nuclear weapon. He led a survey team from the Manhattan Project to assess the effects of the atomic bombings of Hiroshima and Nagasaki. In 1946 he was Chief of the Radiological Safety Section of the Joint Task Force for Operation Crossroads, the nuclear test at Bikini Atoll.

In 1947 Warren became the first dean of the School of Medicine at the University of California, Los Angeles (UCLA). Under his leadership, the new school grew into a major medical school. Although controversial and opposed by James Bryant Conant, Warren would speak out about the dangers of nuclear fallout from weapons testing from about 1947 onwards and upon the Castle Bravo test in 1954 his views were lent some credence, which informed opinion leading up to the Partial Nuclear Test Ban Treaty. Warren became Vice Chancellor, Health Services in 1962 at UCLA. From 1963 to 1965 he served as special assistant to President John F. Kennedy and later Lyndon B. Johnson on mental retardation. Returning to UCLA in 1965, he became professor emeritus, a position he held until his death in 1981. In 1971, he was awarded the Enrico Fermi Award for his contributions to science and medicine.

== Early life ==
Stafford Leak Warren was born in Maxwell, New Mexico, on June 19, 1896. He attended the University of California, Berkeley, where he earned his Bachelor of Arts degree in 1918. He married Viola Lockhart on May 22, 1920. Their marriage produced two sons and a daughter. He went to medical school at the University of California, San Francisco, graduating with his Doctor of Medicine degree in 1922. He then did post-doctoral work at Johns Hopkins School of Medicine and Harvard University.

== University of Rochester ==
Warren joined the faculty of the Department of Radiology at the University of Rochester School of Medicine in 1926, becoming an Assistant Professor of Medicine. The department was a new one that had only been founded in 1921, based upon the ideals of medical education propounded by Abraham Flexner in his 1910 Flexner Report. The medical school had opened in 1925 and did not graduate its first class until 1929. Warren was one of the original group that Dean George Whipple assembled to staff the new medical school. At Rochester, Warren investigated the effects of artificial fever, including its possible use for treating gonococci infections. He was also interested in radiography.

In 1930, Warren became an Associate Professor of Medicine. That year he published "A Roentgenologic Study of the Breast". X-ray imaging of the breast had first been investigated by Albert Salomon at the University of Berlin in 1913. He produced images of over 3,000 mastectomy specimens, and observed different forms and stages of cancer. He was even able to detect an undiagnosed cancer in a breast that had been removed because of a large cyst. However, Salomon apparently did not appreciate the life saving potential of his observations. Warren used radiology to track changes in breast tissue as a result of pregnancy and mastitis. He developed a stereoscopic technique, using patients rather than specimens and adapting general purpose X-ray equipment to his needs. His method involved having the patient lie on her side with one arm raised while being X-rayed. In 119 women who subsequently underwent surgery, he correctly found breast cancer in 54 out of 58 cases. This represented a leap forward, as it made diagnosis of breast cancer possible without surgery. It also sparked intense interest in the technique around the world. Today mammography saves thousands of lives.

== Manhattan Project ==
In February 1943, Warren met with Dr Albert K. Chapman, the vice president and general manager of Eastman Kodak, Brigadier General Leslie R. Groves, the director of the Manhattan Project and Colonel James C. Marshall, the commander of the Manhattan Engineer District (MED). They asked him about his work with radiation and isotopes and asked Warren to become a civilian consultant for the MED. In March 1943, Warren met with Major Hymer L. Friedell at the MED's New York City headquarters. Friedell had joined the Metallurgical Laboratory in August 1942 from the University of California, Berkeley, where he had been involved in radiology research under Dr Robert S. Stone. Friedell requested information about safety matters involving radiation. Warren was unable to provide all the information, but agreed to initiate research at Rochester.

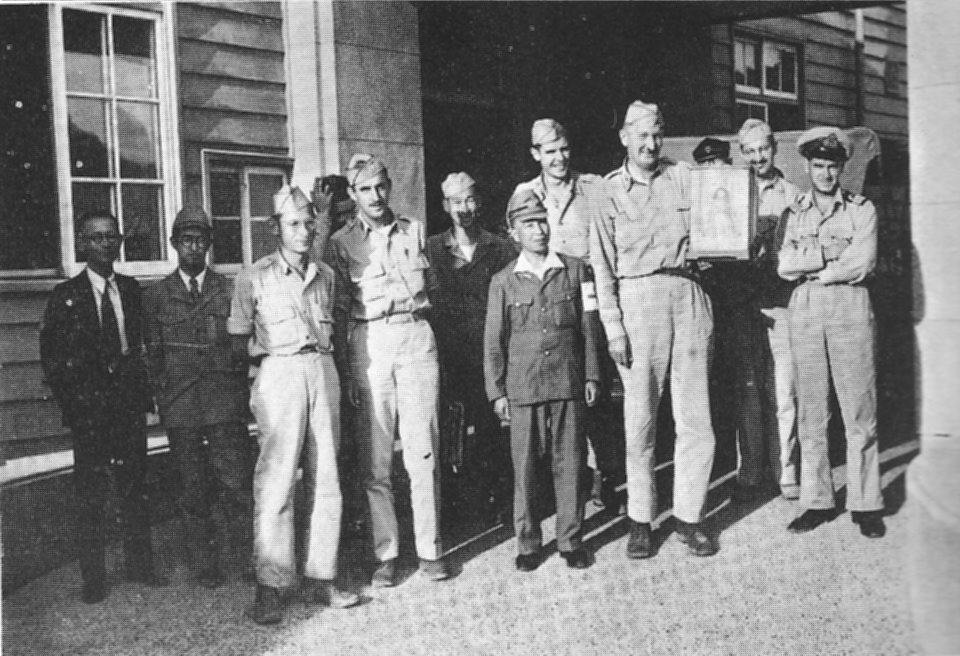
Survey team from the Manhattan Project in Nagasaki, October 1945. Colonel Warren is holding a doll and case given to the team by the Japanese medical commandant of the unit.

Friedell recommended that in view of the scope of the Manhattan Project, a more senior officer be placed in charge. In October, Groves penned a letter to the Surgeon General of the United States Army, Major General Norman T. Kirk, requesting that he cooperate with the Manhattan Project in furnishing medical supplies, providing funds for medical care of military personnel, and directly commissioning Warren and other doctors at specified ranks. This letter was signed by Lieutenant General Brehon B. Somervell and delivered in person by Colonel Kenneth D. Nichols, who had replaced Marshall as the district engineer. Kirk was furious at what he saw as usurpation of his statutory responsibilities as Surgeon General. When told that Warren was the man the district had in mind to commission as a colonel, and apparently familiar with Warren's work only from his use of radiation to treat venereal disease asked "Why do you want that clap doctor?"

Warren was duly commissioned as a colonel in the United States Army Medical Corps on November 3, 1943. He was appointed as chief of the MED's medical section and medical advisor to the director of the Manhattan Project, with Friedell as his deputy. Warren's office was initially located in New York City but moved to Oak Ridge, Tennessee, soon after. Warren's initial task was to staff hospitals at Oak Ridge, Richland, Washington, and Los Alamos, New Mexico. Civilian workers paid $2.50 per month (single) or $5.00 per month (family) for medical insurance.

Warren's section was responsible for medical research, and also for the MED's health and safety programs. This presented an enormous challenge, because workers were handling a variety of toxic chemicals, using hazardous liquids and gases under high pressures, working with high voltages used in novel ways, and performing experiments involving explosives, not to mention the largely unknown dangers presented by radioactivity and handling fissile materials. Yet in December 1945, the National Safety Council presented the Manhattan Project with the Award of Honor for Distinguished Service to Safety in recognition of its safety record. Between January 1943 and June 1945, there were 62 fatalities and 3,879 disabling injuries, which was about 62 percent below that of private industry.

Warren was personally responsible for the safety aspects of the Trinity nuclear test on 16 July 1945 at Alamogordo, New Mexico. There was considerable concern about radioactive fallout and a network of geiger counters was established to track the fallout cloud. Groves found Warren at the base camp shortly after the explosion and was displeased to discover that Warren had been awake for the previous 48 hours. Groves had US Navy Captain George Lyons take over so Warren could get some rest. Fortunately, no problems arose with the test.

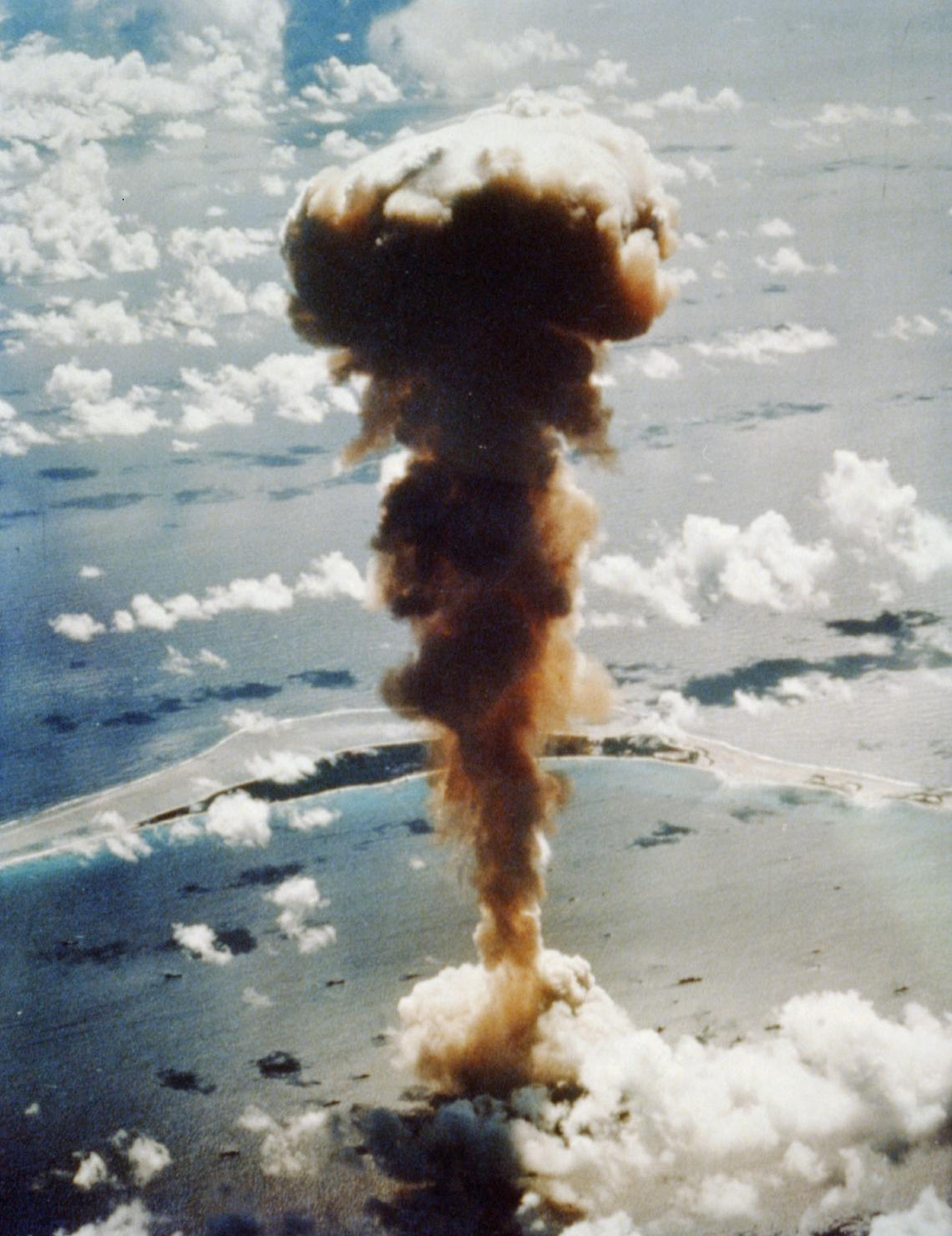
Aerial view of the Able mushroom cloud rising from the lagoon with Bikini Island visible in the background. The cloud carried the radioactive contaminants into the stratosphere.

The atomic bombings of Hiroshima and Nagasaki were carried out on 6 and 9 August 1945. On 11 August, Groves phoned Warren and ordered him to organize a survey team and proceed to Guam, and thence to Japan to evaluate the effect of the atomic bombs and take measures to insure the safety of Allied troops occupying the cities. Initially the survey team was to accompany the assault troops of the III Amphibious Corps and the V Amphibious Corps in the invasion of Japan, but Japan surrendered on 14 August, the day the survey team departed San Francisco by air. The survey team arrived on Tinian on 17 August, where it was split into two parties, one under Warren and the other under Friedell. Warren's party, equipped with portable geiger counters, arrived in Hiroshima by air on 8 September as part of a group headed by Brigadier General Thomas F. Farrell that also included Brigadier General James B. Newman Jr and Japanese Rear Admiral Masao Tsuzuki, who acted as a translator. They remained in Hiroshima until 14 September and then surveyed Nagasaki from 19 September to 8 October. They were impressed by both the damage done by the atomic bombs and the extensive Japanese preparations for an American invasion.

The detonation of the two atomic bombs in Japan "raised as many military and medicomilitary questions as they answered". A series of nuclear tests was planned, codenamed Operation Crossroads. Some 42,000 personnel were deployed to Bikini Atoll as part of Admiral William H. P. Blandy's Joint Task Force 1 to conduct the test. Their health and safety was Lyons's responsibility, but the specialised job of radiological safety was handled by the Manhattan Project. Warren, as Chief of the Radiological Safety Section (RADSAFE), planned and implemented measures to assess, limit and control the impact of radiation. Teams were given special training at Oak Ridge in the operation of instrumentation to measure radioactivity, and the interpretation of their readings. Training was also conducted aboard USS Haven en route to Bikini Atoll, where it arrived on 12 June 1946. In all, some 3,500 personnel were assigned to RADSAFE. Warren was appalled by the effects of radioactive contamination on the environment. "The deadly range of radioactive products from the atomic bomb has been clearly demonstrated under controlled conditions..." he wrote, "the only defense against atomic bombs still lies outside the scope of science. It is the prevention of atomic war."

Warren left the Army on 6 November 1946. He temporarily became the Chief of the Medical Section of the Atomic Energy Commission, the civilian agency which succeeded the Manhattan Project. In February 1947, he was replaced by Dr Shields Warren. For his services with the Manhattan Engineer District. Warren was awarded the Army Distinguished Service Medal and the Legion of Merit.

== University of California ==
Toward the end of World War II, a group of physicians proposed that the University of California should establish a medical school in Southern California. One of them was the urologist Elmer Belt, whose patients included the Governor of California, Earl Warren. The University of California Board of Regents voted to establish a medical school as part of the University of California at Los Angeles (UCLA) on October 19, 1945. In 1946 the California State Legislature unanimously voted $7 million to establish the new school, and Earl Warren signed it into law.

In 1947, Warren was appointed the new school's first dean. Once again he found himself involved in creating a new medical school. His first appointments were three former associates in Rochester: Dr Charles Carpenter as the first professor of infectious disease; Dr. Andrew H. Dowdy as the first professor of radiology; and Dr John S. Lawrence, who had pioneered the use of phosphorus-32 as a radioactive tracer, as professor of medicine. With Dr William P. Longmire Jr, a 34-year-old plastic surgeon from Johns Hopkins University recruited by Lawrence as professor of surgery, they became the "Founding Five" of the new school. Initially, the new school was accommodated in wartime Quonset huts scattered about the UCLA campus. Warren was still wearing his army fatigues. Construction of permanent accommodation commenced in 1949. By 1951 when the first students, 26 men and two women, arrived there were 15 faculty members. By the time the first class graduated in 1955 there were 43 faculty members. The UCLA Medical Center opened in 1955.

Under Warren's leadership, the school grew steadily, adding schools of dentistry, nursing, and public health. Against some influential opposition, Warren established his medical school on the UCLA campus rather than in another part of the city. He strove to integrate not only the structures but the faculty with other departments of the university. He fostered the development of a major biomedical library as both a tangible and intellectual link between the life sciences and the health sciences.

Warren became the vice chancellor for health services in 1962. From 1963 to 1965 he served as special assistant to President John F. Kennedy and later Lyndon B. Johnson on mental retardation. Returning to UCLA in 1965, he became professor emeritus, a position he held until his death in 1981. His first wife Viola died in 1963 and on July 18, 1970, he married Gertrude Turner Hubberty. In 1971, Warren was awarded the Enrico Fermi Award. His citation read:

For the imaginative, prescient, and vigorous efforts which made possible the early development of atomic energy so as to assure the protection of man and the environment, and for the establishment of a biomedical research program which has resulted in many substantial applications of ionizing radiation to diagnosis and treatment of disease and to the general welfare.

He died on July 26, 1981, in Pacific Palisades, Los Angeles. His papers are in the UCLA Library, Department of Special Collections.

The Stafford L. Warren Medal is named in his honor and is awarded to the top graduating medical student from the David Geffen School of Medicine at UCLA each year.

== Bibliography ==
- Gold, Richard H. (2005). "History of Breast Imaging". In Bassett, Lawrence Wayne; Jackson, Valerie P.; Fu, Karin L.; et al. (eds.). Diagnosis of Diseases of the Breast. Philadelphia, Pennsylvania: Saunders. ISBN 978-0-7216-9563-1. OCLC 488959603.
- Groves, Leslie (1962). Now it Can be Told: The Story of the Manhattan Project. New York: Harper & Row. OCLC 537684.
- Jones, Vincent (1985). Manhattan: The Army and the Atomic Bomb. Washington, D.C.: United States Army Center of Military History. OCLC 10913875.
- Nichols, Kenneth David (1987). The Road to Trinity: A Personal Account of How America's Nuclear Policies Were Made. New York: William Morrow and Company. ISBN 978-0-688-06910-0. OCLC 15223648.
- Warren, Stafford L. (1966). "The Role of Radiology in the Development of the Atomic Bomb". In Ahnfeldt, Arnold Lorentz (ed.). Radiology in World War II. Washington, D.C.: Office of the Surgeon General, Department of the Army. OCLC 630225.
