= Abbie Huston Evans =

American writer (1881–1983)

Abbie Huston Evans (December 20, 1881 – October 1983) was an American poet and teacher.

== Life ==
Her father, Bard Lewis Darenydd Evans, immigrated to the United States from Wales. He labored as a coal miner, until he was accepted for college. He studied two years at Western Reserve University, and graduated from Bangor Theological Seminary.

Abbie Evans was born in Lee, New Hampshire, and graduated from Radcliffe College with a B.A. (1913, Phi Beta Kappa) and M.A. (1918), where she studied with Odell Shepard. She went to France during World War I, then came home to work as a social worker to coal miners in Colorado and Pittsburgh. She later taught at the Settlement Music School in Philadelphia from 1923 to 1953. She lived at 414 Queen Street in Philadelphia. Then she taught at College Settlement Farm-Camp in Horsham, Pennsylvania from 1953 to 1957. She summer vacationed at the Maine coast.

Edna St. Vincent Millay was a friend from Sunday school, and wrote an introduction to Outcrop. Margaret Marshall, at Harcourt, Brace was her friend, and poetry editor. Louise Bogan accepted Abbie’s poems for The New Yorker.

She received an honorary degree from Bowdoin College, in 1961,

Her poems appeared in The Nation, The New Yorker, and Poetry. She recorded for the Library of Congress in 1964.

Her letters with Odell Shepard are at the University of Delaware. Barbara Lachman was working on a biography.

== Awards ==
- 1931 Guarantor's Prize (Poetry, Chicago)
- 1960 Loines Memorial Award of the National Institute of Arts and Letters
- 1962 Fact of Crystal won a National Book Award
- 1965 New England Poetry Club Golden Rose Award

== Works ==
- Outcrop. Harper & brothers. 1928.
- Bright North. Macmillan. 1938.
- Fact of Crystal. Harcourt, Brace. 1961.
- Collected poems. University of Pittsburgh Press. 1970. ISBN 978-0-8229-3208-6.
