= Russell Loines Award for Poetry =

Russell Loines Award for Poetry was a poetry award by the American Academy of Arts and Letters of $1000.

Year	Winner	Title
1983	Geoffrey Hill	The Mystery of the Charity of Charles Péguy
1981	Ben Belitt	
1976	Mona Van Duyn	To See, To Take
1974	Philip Larkin	High Windows
1972	William Jay Smith	The Tin Can and Other Poems.
1970	Robert Hayden	Words in the Mourning Time: Poems by Robert Hayden
1968	Anthony Hecht	The Hard Hours
1966	William Meredith	The Wreck of the Thresher and Other Poems
1964	John Berryman	77 Dream Songs
1962	Ivor Armstrong Richards	
1960	Abbie Huston Evans	Fact of Crystal.
1958	Robert Graves	The Poems of Robert Graves
1957	Edwin Muir	One foot in Eden
1956	John Betjeman	Poems In The Porch
1954	David Jones	The Anathemata
1951	John Crowe Ransom	Selected Poems
1948	William Carlos Williams	Paterson
1942	Horace Gregory	Poems, 1930-1940.
1939	Joy Davidman	Letter to a Comrade.
1933	Edward Doro	The Boar and Shibboleth: with other poems
1931	Robert Frost	Collected Poems
