= Edward Doro =

American writer (1909–1987)

- Born: February 3, 1909; Dickinson, North Dakota, U.S.
- Died: 1987 (aged 77–78)
- Education: University of Southern California (BA); University of Pennsylvania (MA)
- Occupation: Poet

Edward Doro (February 3, 1909 – 1987) was an American poet.

== Life ==
Doro was born in Dickinson, North Dakota, the son of a Californian banker. He studied at the University of Southern California (B.A., 1929) and the University of Pennsylvania (M.A., 1931). Doro later moved to Arizona.

== Awards ==
- 1936 Guggenheim Fellowship
- 1939 Russell Loines Award for Poetry, by American Academy of Arts and Letters

== Works ==
- Alms for oblivion, Casa editorial Franco-ibero-Americana, 1932
- The Boar and Shibboleth: with other poems, woods engravings Paul Landacre, Alfred A. Knopf, 1933
- Mr. Zenith: & other poems, The Bookman press, 1942
- Shiloh: fragments on a famous theme, G. P. Putnam, 1936
- Mr. Zenith & Other Poems, Bookman Press, 1942
- Parisian interlude, W. Doan, 1960
- The furtherance, Franconia College Press, 1966

=== Anthologies ===
- Twentieth-century American poetry, Editor Conrad Aiken, Modern Library, 1963

== Reviews ==
THIS book of poems, beautifully printed and illustrated with some fine wood engravings, is, in good part, a reprint of Mr. Doro's poems first published by the poet himself about two years ago in Paris. But to this first American edition several poems have been added and they make all the difference.
