= Marya Zaturenska =

American poet

- Born: September 12, 1902; Kyiv, Ukraine
- Died: January 19, 1982 (aged 79); Shelburne Falls, Massachusetts
- Education: Valparaiso University; University of Wisconsin, Madison (BA)
- Spouse: Horace Gregory (m. 1925)
- Writing career
- Genre: Lyric poetry
- Notable work: Cold Morning Sky
- Notable awards: Pulitzer Prize for Poetry (1938)

Marya Zaturenska (September 12, 1902 – January 19, 1982) was an American lyric poet, winner of the Pulitzer Prize for Poetry in 1938.

== Life ==
She was born in Kyiv and her family emigrated to the United States, when she was eight and lived in New York. Like many immigrants, she worked in a clothing factory during the day, but was able to attend night high school. She was an outstanding student and won a scholarship to Valparaiso University; she later transferred to the University of Wisconsin–Madison, receiving a degree in library science. She met her husband, the prize-winning poet Horace Gregory there; they married in 1925. Her two children were Patrick and Joanna Gregory. She wrote eight volumes of poetry, including the Pulitzer Prize-winning Cold Morning Sky, and she edited six anthologies of poetry.

Her work appeared in The New York Times, Poetry Magazine,

== Awards ==
- 1938 Pulitzer Prize

== Works ==
=== Poetry ===
- Threshold and Hearth. The Macmillan company. 1934.
- Cold Morning Sky. Macmillan. 1937.
- The Listening Landscape. Macmillan, New York. 1941
- The Golden Mirror. New York: The Macmillan company. 1944.
- Selected poems. Grove Press. 1954.
- Terraces of Light. Grove Press. 1960
- Collected Poems. Viking Press. 1965.
- The Hidden Waterfall: poems. Vanguard Press. 1974.
- Robert S. Phillips, ed. (2002). New selected poems of Marya Zaturenska. Syracuse University Press. ISBN 978-0-8156-0717-5.

=== Editor ===
- Christina Georgina Rossetti (1970). Marya Zaturenska (ed.). Selected poems of Christina Rossetti. Macmillan.

=== Non-fiction ===
- Mary Beth Hinton, ed. (2002). The diaries of Marya Zaturenska, 1938-1944. Syracuse University Press. ISBN 978-0-8156-0714-4.
- Marya Zaturenska; Horace Gregory (1946). A History of American poetry, 1900-1940. Harcourt, Brace and Co.
- Marya Zaturenska, (1949). Christina Rossetti, A Portrait With Background, The MacMillan Company.
