= Auerhahn Press =

Auerhahn Press was a publishing company in San Francisco between 1959 and 1965, founded by printer-poet Dave Haselwood. The company published many key poets of the San Francisco Renaissance.

Stated in advertisements appearing in Evergreen Review, Poetry, City Lights Journal and Big Table magazines, the press's goal was “to re-marry good printing and writing,” and to this end the Auerhahn published 28 letterpress-printed titles between 1958 and 1964. Most were chapbooks handset by Haselwood, later with Andrew Hoyem, in a creative and subtle variety of fonts. Its first title was The Hotel Wentley Poems by John Wieners.

The press was based in San Francisco and published the first books of many emerging and soon-to-be influential poets, including Wieners and Lew Welch. Its catalogue, uniformly out of print, included works by Jack Spicer; Diane DiPrima; Philip Lamantia; Michael McClure; Philip Whalen; David Meltzer; William Everson (Brother Antoninus); Charles Olson; and the first edition of Exterminator, an early collaboration using the cut-up technique by William S. Burroughs and Brion Gysin. These among others, were the “insurgent American writers” that the press detected in its search for the “bold, free and courageous in modern writing”.

Thanks to the printer's touch as much as to the collaborative energies of artists like Bruce Conner, Ray Johnson, Robert LaVigne, Robert Ronnie Branaman and Wallace Berman, the Auerhahn's books — and its ephemera — seemed to float in the shadows between high art and faded handbill.

“The first & final consideration in printing poetry is the poetry itself,” Haselwood wrote in 1960. “If the poems are great they create their own space; the publisher is just a midwife during the final operation & if he has to do a lot of dirty work that’s the way it should be. Contrary to what a lot of people including publishers think, publishing is not a gentleman’s profession, it is the profession of a crook or a madman.”

As the press grew influential, if not solvent, artistic conflict followed, most notably with DiPrima, Robert Duncan (who canceled his book in mid-production), early collaborator Jonathan Williams, and Spicer, who in an occasional poem dated October 1, 1962, wrote: “This is an ode to John Wieners and the Auerhahn Press / Who have driven me away from poetry like a fast car”.

In 1964, Haselwood turned production and last rites of the Auerhahn Press over to his partner Andrew Hoyem and started Dave Haselwood Books.

== Publications ==
- John Wieners, The Hotel Wentley Poems, 1958.
- William Burroughs and Brion Gysin, The Exterminator, 1959.
- Philip Lamantia, Ekstasis, 1959.
- Philip Whalen, Self-Portrait, From Another Direction, 1959.
- Michael McClure, Hymns to St. Geryon and Other Poems, 1959
- Lew Welch, Wobbly Rock, 1960.
- Philip Whalen, Memoirs of an Interglacial Age, 1960.
- Edward Marshall, Hellan, Hellan, 1960.
- David Page, Babywhipland, 1961.
- Michael McClure, Dark Brown, 1961.
- Charles Olson, Maximus, From Dogtown I, 1961.
- Paul Reps, Gold/Fish Signatures, 1962.
- Philip Lamantia, Destroyed Works, 1962.
- David Meltzer, We All Have Something To Say To Each Other, 1962.
- Jonathan Williams, In England's Green & (A Garland and a Clyster), 1962.
- Andrew Hoyem, The Wake, 1963.
- Robin Blaser, Apparitors, 1963.
- Roxie Powell, Dreams of Straw, 1963.
- Bill Deemer, Poems, 1964
- Jonathan Williams, Lines About Hills Above Lakes, 1964.
- David Meltzer, The Blackest Rose, 1964.
- Philip Whalen, Goddess, 1964.
- Robert Creeley, Two Poems (Broadside), 1964.
- Michael McClure, Two for Bruce Connor, 1964.
- Josephine Miles, In Identity, 1964.
- Brother Antoninus, The Poet Is Dead, 1964.
- Charles Olson, Human Universe and Other Essays, 1965.
