= Paul Landacre =

American artist (1893–1963)

- Born: Paul Hambleton Landacre; July 9, 1893; Columbus, Ohio, U.S.
- Died: June 3, 1963 (aged 69); Los Angeles, California, U.S.
- Education: Ohio State University
- Occupation: Artist
- Style: Wood engraving
- Spouse: Margaret McCreery (m. 1925; died 1963)

Paul Hambleton Landacre (July 9, 1893, Columbus, Ohio – June 3, 1963, Los Angeles, California) was an American artist based in Los Angeles. His artistic innovations and technical virtuosity gained wood engraving a foothold as a high art form in twentieth-century America. Landacre's linocuts and wood engravings of landscapes, still lifes, nudes, and abstractions are acclaimed for the beauty of their designs and a mastery of materials. He used the finest inks and imported handmade Japanese papers and, with a few exceptions, printed his wood engravings in his studio on a 19th-century Washington Hand Press, which is now in the collection of the International Printing Museum in Carson, California.

== Early life ==
Paul Hambleton Landacre was born in Columbus, Ohio, in 1893 into a family of scientists. His father, Walter, graduated from college with a degree in analytical chemistry and worked as an analytical and consulting chemist. His uncle, Frank, received a doctorate from the University of Chicago, became a full professor of anatomy at Ohio State University, and President of the Ohio Academy of Science. Landacre's mother, Clara Jane Hambleton, also came from a well-educated and scientifically-minded family largely of Quaker descent. Her brother, James Chace Hambleton, was a naturalist who served as the first president of the Audubon Society in Columbus, Ohio.

During his sophomore year at Ohio State University, Landacre suffered a debilitating streptococcus infection that left his right leg permanently stiffened and his dreams of becoming an Olympic track and field athlete shattered. In 1917, after an extended hospitalization, he left Ohio to convalesce in the more healthful climate outside San Diego where his father and step-mother had recently relocated. Landacre met his future wife, Margaret McCreery, in San Diego where they both worked in the advertising industry. Also a transplanted Midwesterner (born in Missouri in 1891), McCreery wrote advertising copy and advanced her prospects by moving to downtown Los Angeles. Landacre soon followed. They were married in July 1925 in Laguna Beach. McCreery played an instrumental, behind-the-scenes role in her husband's successful transition to becoming a professional printmaker of national renown. In the turbulent wake of his wife's death in 1963, Paul declared that "everything I did in my work and everything I thought or said was as much or more of Margaret's as it was mine."

== Career in Los Angeles ==
Although he took a few life-drawing classes at the Otis Art Institute between 1923 and 1925, Landacre largely taught himself the art of printmaking. He experimented with the technically demanding art of carving linoleum blocks and, eventually, woodblocks for both wood engravings and woodcuts. His fascination with printmaking and his ambition to make a place for himself in the world of fine art coalesced in the late 1920s when he met Jake Zeitlin. Zeitlin's antiquarian bookshop in Los Angeles—a cultural hub that survived into the 1980s—included a small gallery space for the showing of artworks, primarily prints and drawings, and it is there in 1929 that Landacre's first prints were exhibited. In early 1930 Zeitlin gave Landacre his first significant solo exhibition in southern California. Zeitlin's ever-widening circle of artists embraced Edward Weston, a photographer, and Henrietta Shore, a painter and printmaker, each of whom shared the modernist vision that so captivated Landacre. In early 1934, Zeitlin, together with screenwriter and Hollywood insider Delmer Daves, organized the Paul Landacre Association. Its thirteen original members included a cross section of local cultural and industrial elites who reflected the vigor, wealth, and cosmopolitan nature of early modern Los Angeles. Each member committed $100 annually to purchase Landacre's new works. Between 1934 and 1940, the years of the Association's sponsorship, Landacre "reached artistic maturity and produced a succession of award-winning prints ...."

Well-connected to the New York art scene, Zeitlin handled the work of many American artists represented by Carl Zigrosser, director of the Weyhe Gallery in Manhattan and, later, curator of prints at the Philadelphia Museum of Art. By 1936 Zigrosser considered Landacre to be "one of the few graphic artists worth watching" in America, and included him among his portraits of 24 contemporary American printmakers in his seminal work, "The Artist in America" (Knopf 1942). Rockwell Kent also praised Landacre as, without exception, the finest wood engraver in America. Elected an associate member of the National Academy of Design in 1939 and a full Academician in 1946, Landacre was honored in 1947 with a solo exhibition of his wood engravings at the Smithsonian Museum, its graphic arts division under the curatorial leadership of Jacob Kainen. Los Angeles printer and book designer Harry Ward Ritchie (Ward Ritchie) also recognized Landacre's extraordinary gifts and between 1932 and 1957 collaborated with him on some 25 printing projects. Often, Ritchie commissioned Landacre to conceive decorative wood engravings for privately distributed books of small format and limited edition.

Of national and local appeal, many of Landacre's linoleum cuts and wood engravings were inspired by the American Far West, including the hills and mountains of Big Sur, Palm Springs, Monterey, and Berkeley. "California Hills and Other Wood Engravings by Paul Landacre" (Los Angeles: Bruce McCallister, 1931), a limited-edition folio comprising 15 of Landacre's early works printed from the original blocks, was awarded recognition as one of the "Fifty Books of the Year" for 1931. In rapid succession, three books featuring his wood engraved designs also garnered such recognition: "The Boar and the Shibboleth" (1933), "A Gil Blas in California" (1933), and "XV Poems for the Heath Broom" (1934). In the 1950s, the AIGA recognized "A Natural History of Western Trees" (1953) and "Books West Southwest, Essays on Writers, Their Books and Their Land" (1957) as "Fifty Books of the Year", and they became the fifth and sixth books with Landacre designs to win the prestigious award. For "Trees" Landacre contributed more than 200 ink drawings on scratchboard.

Landacre developed a distinctive, mature style characterized by its formal qualities—carved fine lines, cross hatching, and flecking—elements in white which contrast with blacks. His prints, including the early linocuts, received critical recognition, received several awards , and are found in more than a hundred and fifty public collections throughout the United States.

Landacre died in 1963, shortly after the death of his wife who had been his companion for 38 years. She even helped the artist later in his life pull impressions from the formidable Washington Hand Press.

== City of Los Angeles Historic-Cultural Monument ==
In March 1932, the artist and his wife purchased a rustic one-bedroom bungalow at 2006 El Moran Street where they lived for the remainder of their lives. The modest home was perched near the top of an impossibly steep and winding Peru Street.

The neighborhood tract was known as the Semi-Tropic Spiritualists' Association in an area of Echo Park formerly known as Edendale, an historic district near downtown Los Angeles. Conservationist Charles J. Fisher successfully applied for landmark status, and in March 2006, the Landacres's hillside home was declared City of Los Angeles Historic-Cultural Monument No. 839.

== Legacy ==
- Landacre's papers and many of his original blocks and prints are housed at the William Andrews Clark Memorial Library at UCLA.
- Jake Milgram Wien, a cultural historian and independent curator, is author of Paul Landacre: California Hills, Hollywood & the World Beyond--the two-volume catalogue raisonne of Paul Landacre's prints, drawings, and paintings. The catalogue was published by Abbeville Press in February 2025. With 350 catalogue entries and upwards of 1000 illustrations, the volumes include a life chronology, a comprehensive listing of the artist's solo exhibitions, key reprints of hard-to-find archival documents pertaining to the artist and his wife, and a selected bibliography.
- Paul and Margaret Landacre's Cabin in Echo Park is now a Los Angeles Historic-Cultural Monument

== Works illustrated ==
- California Hills and Other Wood Engravings by Paul Landacre (edition of 500, 1931)
- The Boar and the Shibboleth by Edward Doro (edition of 500, 1933)
- A Gil Blas in California by Alexandre Dumas, père (1934)
- XV Poems for the Heath Broom by Ward Ritchie aka Peter Lum Quince (edition of 50, 1934)
- Farewell Thou Busy World by John Hodgdon Bradley (1935)
- The Year's At The Spring by Ward Ritchie aka Peter Lum Quince (edition of 150, 1938)
- Flowering Earth by Donald Culross Peattie (1939)
- The Road of a Naturalist by Donald Culross Peattie (1941)
- Tales of Soldiers and Civilians by Ambrose Bierce (Limited Editions Club, edition of 1500, 1943; also trade edition, 1943)
- Immortal Village by Donald Culross Peattie (1945)
- A Natural History of Trees of Eastern and Central North America by Donald Culross Peattie (1950; 2nd ed 1966; reprint as trade paperback with introduction by Robert Finch, 1991)
- A Natural History of Western Trees by Donald Culross Peattie (1953; reprint as trade paperback with introduction by Robert Finch, 1991)
- The Great Chain of Life by Joseph Wood Krutch (1957)
- De Rerum Natura [On the Nature of Things] by Titus Lucretius Carus (Limited Editions Club, edition of 1500, 1957; also trade edition, 1957)
- On the Origin of Species by Means of Natural Selection or the Preservation of Favoured Races in the Struggle for Life by Charles Darwin (Limited Editions Club, edition of 1500, 1963; also trade edition, 1963)

== Works reproduced in ==
- The Artist in America, Carl Zigrosser (New York: Knopf, 1942).
- Prints by California Artists edited by T. V. Roelof-Lanner (Crest of Hollywood Fine Arts Publishers, 1954)
- Paul Landacre: A Life and a Legacy, Anthony L. Lehman (Los Angeles: Dawson's Book Shop, 1983).
- Graphic Excursions: American Prints in Black and White, 1900-1950, Selections From the Collection of Reba and Dave Williams, The American Federation of Arts (New York: David R. Godine, 1991).
- Paul Landacre and the Ward Ritchie Press, Ward Ritchie, Matrix 15 (Winter 1995), a journal printed and published in an edition of 950 copies by The Whittington Press, England.
- Pressed in Time: American Prints 1905-1950, Jessica Todd Smith and Kevin M. Murphy (San Marino, California: Henry E. Huntington Library and Art Gallery, 2007).
- L.A.'s Early Moderns, Victoria Dailey, Natalie Shivers, Michael Dawson, and William Deverell (Los Angeles: Balcony Press, 2003).
- The Best of Both Worlds: Finely Printed Livres d'Artistes, 1910-2010, Jerry Kelly, Riva Castleman, and Anne H. Hoy, with a Preface by Peter Strauss (Boston: David R. Godine, 2011).
