= Ian Fisher (journalist) =

American journalist (born 1965)

- Born: Charles Ian Fisher; October 4, 1965 (age 61)
- Occupation: Journalist
- Notable credit: The New York Times
- Spouse: Selma Kalousek

Charles Ian Fisher (born October 4, 1965) is an American journalist who edits for The New York Times. He worked for 27 years at The New York Times, as a foreign and war correspondent, editor and digital chief. After six years at Bloomberg starting in 2018, he returned to The Times in 2026 as Washington, DC, weekend editor.

At The Times, he served a number of roles, from deputy executive editor in charge to digital operations in the newsroom, to investigative editor to weekend editor. From 2008 to 2011, he was deputy foreign editor. He served two years as day editor for The Times home page, and 2013 was named assistant managing editor in charge of newsroom digital operations.

Fisher graduated from Boston University in 1987 and began his newspaper career at The Sun in Lowell, Massachusetts. In 1990, he joined The New York Times as a clerk and was promoted to reporter in 1992.

From 1998 to 2001, Fisher was The New York Times' East Africa bureau chief (based in Nairobi, Kenya). He was bureau chief for Eastern Europe and the Balkans from 2001 to 2004. From 2004 to 2008, he was the paper's bureau chief in Rome. He covered various conflicts, including Iraq and the second intifada in Israel. He began in Jerusalem full-time in January 2017 and left the paper later that year.

== Personal life ==
Fisher is married to Selma Kalousek, a photography editor.

== Bibliography ==
=== As contributor ===
- Hicks, Tyler. Histories Are Mirrors: The Path of Conflict through Iraq and Afghanistan. New York: Umbrage Editions, 2004. ISBN 1-884167-44-6 ISBN 978-1884167447
