= Andrew Hoyem =

American typographer, letterpress printer, publisher, poet

- Born: 1 December 1935; Sioux Falls, South Dakota
- Occupations: typographer, printer, publisher
- Known for: Arion Press, founder
- Spouse: Diana Ketcham

Andrew Lewison Hoyem (born 1 December 1935) is a typographer, letterpress printer, publisher, poet, and preservationist. He is the founder (in 1974) and was the director of Arion Press in San Francisco until his retirement in October 2018. Arion Press "is considered the nation's leading publisher of fine-press books," according to the Minneapolis Star Tribune. Arion Press "carries on a grand legacy of San Francisco printers and bookmakers," according to Michael Kimmelman of The New York Times. Hoyem’s work in preserving the nation’s last typefoundry has been recognized by the National Trust for Historic Preservation.

As Arion Press’s designer, master printer, and editor, Hoyem used techniques of printing from metal type going back to Gutenberg and revived the turn of the century tradition of the livre d’artiste, matching literature with original work by major contemporary artists, including William Kentridge (The Lulu Plays), Jasper Johns (Poetry of Wallace Stevens), John Baldessari (Tristram Shandy), Kiki Smith (Poetry of Emily Dickinson), Richard Diebenkorn (Poetry of W. B. Yeats), Wayne Thiebaud (Invisible Cities, The Physiology of Taste), Alex Katz (Poetry of Bill Berkson), Martin Puryear (Cane), R. B. Kitaj (The Wasteland, Kaddish, Exit Ghost), Robert Motherwell (Ulysses), and Jim Dine (The Apocalypse, Biotherm, Case Study of the Wolf-Man, Temple of Flora).

Hoyem has published such contemporary writers as Seamus Heaney (Squarings, Stone from Delphi), Robert Alter (Genesis, translation), Tom Stoppard (Arcadia), Lawrence Ferlinghetti (A Coney Island of the Mind), David Mamet (American Buffalo), and scholars Helen Vendler (editions of Wallace Stevens, Allen Ginsberg, Shakespeare’s sonnets, and Melville), Arthur Danto (Henry James, Wittgenstein’s On Certainty), and Richard Wollheim (Freud), as well as classics by Cervantes (Don Quixote), Emily Dickinson, Jane Austen (Sense and Sensibility), T. S. Eliot, Dickens (A Christmas Carol), Flaubert (Bouvard and Pecuchet), Benjamin Franklin (Autobiography), Herman Melville (Moby-Dick, poetry), Pushkin (Eugene Onegin), Walt Whitman (Leaves of Grass), Sappho, Wallace Stevens, Hart Crane (The Bridge), Laurence Sterne, Shakespeare, and others. Hoyem also published works of history, science, and philosophy, and commissioned new translations.

Hoyem summarized his career in an interview with Elizabeth Farnsworth of the PBS-TV NewsHour with Jim Lehrer: "I started out by having a combined interest in literature and visual arts, and enjoyed drawing as well as writing poetry, and those two interests really came to one in the making of books by hand."

== Biography ==
Hoyem was born on 1 December 1935 in Sioux Falls, South Dakota. He graduated from Pomona College and served in the U.S. Navy. In 1961 he became a partner with Dave Haselwood in The Auerhahn Press, a small literary press that published Beat Generation writers. Hoyem designed books for trade publishers, including a series of Richard Brautigan’s novels. He learned typography, typesetting and printing by working part-time at the Grabhorn Press. In 1966 he formed Grabhorn-Hoyem in partnership with Robert Grabhorn, the surviving proprietor of the Grabhorn Press, which he established in 1920 with his brother, Edwin. After Grabhorn's death in 1973, Hoyem founded the Arion Press with the equipment and type collection of the Grabhorns, including rare types and outstanding faces from European foundries destroyed in World War II. Hoyem took the press's name from the Greek poet of legend who was saved by a dolphin. From 1974 to 2018, he published 113 limited-edition books under the Arion Press imprint, including such monumental undertakings as Melville's Moby-Dick, Joyce's Ulysses, and a folio Bible.

The scholar James D. Hart, writing in Fine Printing: The San Francisco Tradition, characterized Hoyem's books "as marked by an unusual inventiveness", praising the handset folio edition of Moby-Dick as a "majestic volume", among Arion's "virtuoso performances". According to Biblio magazine, "Many authorities rank this edition of Moby-Dick as one of the two or three greatest American fine-press books."

Hoyem's most ambitious project is the Folio Bible, with production extending over several years. This is likely to be the last Bible to be printed from metal type, following in the tradition of large-format Bibles printed from movable type that extends from Johannes Gutenberg through John Baskerville, the Doves Press, and the Oxford Lectern Bible, designed by Bruce Rogers. The Christian Science Monitor reported that "From melting the lead, to proofreading, to physically lifting 40-pound frames of type, the consensus of Andrew Hoyem, as publisher of the Arion Press, and his small crew of eight craftspeople, is that a hand-wrought Bible is intrinsically valuable”.

Hoyem’s Arion Press books are in the collections of museums and libraries including The New York Public Library, the British Library, the Bibliothèque Nationale, Duke University Library, Stanford University Library, and the University of Iowa Library. Hoyem’s books are exhibited in museums and galleries. Arion Press’s The Apocalypse and On Certainty were included among the 100 great books of the 20th century in “A Century of Artist Books” at the Museum of Modern Art, New York, 1994, and “A Century for the Century” at New York's Grolier Club.

Hoyem’s limited editions have been reissued in trade editions including reduced format editions of its Moby-Dick (with artist Barry Moser) used in college courses, and of Brillat-Savarin’s Physiology of Taste (with artist Wayne Thiebaud).

== Preservation ==
In 1989 Hoyem acquired and saved Mackenzie & Harris, the oldest and largest remaining type foundry in the United States, established with equipment displayed at the Panama–Pacific International Exposition in 1915, thereby creating a workshop where all of the traditional crafts of bookmaking are practiced under one roof, from making type out of molten lead, to letterpress printing, to binding books by hand. Printing museum director Justin Knopp wrote from Oxford, England “There is now no other business like it anywhere in the world. You are truly unique in the literal and only sense of the word.” Hoyem’s activities made him a notable figure in the book arts renaissance that began in the 1980s, as well as in industrial preservation. Writing in Preservation magazine, art critic Martica Sawin said “The collaboration among Arion Press, M & H Type, and the Grabhorn Institute is a model for preserving historic manufacturing equipment, keeping alive disappearing crafts, and printing beautiful artifacts—all in one enterprise."

In 2000 Hoyem's operation was threatened by eviction, requiring the logistical challenge and expense of moving over 140 tons of equipment and metal type to a suitable new facility. In response, Hoyem founded the nonprofit Grabhorn Institute to preserve and continue the operation of one of the last integrated facilities for typefounding, letterpress printing, and bookbinding. Hoyem retrofitted a 1924 steam plant in the Presidio of San Francisco, where his operation opened to the public as a cultural tenant of the new national park. As executive director of the Grabhorn Institute, he took on the role of educator, presenting an apprenticeship program, college courses, and a series of gallery exhibitions and lectures. In 2000 Hoyem's operation was designated by the National Trust for Historic Preservation as part of "the nation's irreplaceable historical and cultural legacy" under its Save America's Treasures program.

Hoyem is a member of the Grolier Club, Roxburghe Club, American Printing History Association, and holds an honorary doctorate from Pomona College.

== Published works (poetry) ==
Articles, Poems: 1960-67, Cape Goliard Press, London, and New York: Grossman Publishers, 1969

Picture-Poems, illustrated catalogue of drawings and related writings, 1961-74, for exhibition, Fine Arts Museums of San Francisco, San Francisco: Arion Press, 1975.

What If, poems 1969-1987, San Francisco: Arion Press, 1987.
