= Arion Press =

California book publisher

- Industry: Fine book publishing
- Predecessors: Grabhorn Press; M&H Type
- Founded: 1974; 52 years ago
- Founder: Andrew Hoyem
- Headquarters: San Francisco, California, United States
- Website: arionpress.com

Arion Press is an American book publishing company in San Francisco. Founded in San Francisco in 1974, it publishes limited-edition books illustrated by notable artists using letterpress equipment dating to the 1910s. Everything needed to make the books including the custom fonts are hand made on-site, making the press more vertically integrated than most. The books are custom creations tailored to each work being republished.

== History ==
Arion Press is named for a mythical Greek poet, Arion. Kimmelman of The New York Times wrote in 2006 that Arion Press "carries on a grand legacy of San Francisco printers and bookmakers." It was founded by Andrew Hoyem, continuing the tradition of the Grabhorn Press of Edwin and Robert Grabhorn. Hoyem had been partners for seven years with the younger Grabhorn brother, and after his death started Arion Press, preserving the Grabhorns' historic collection of American metal type. In 1989 Arion acquired M&H Type, which like Graborn had been established in San Francisco in the 1910s, and constitutes the oldest and largest hot metal type foundry in the U.S. for letterpress printers. M&H's collection of antique type is the second largest in the United States, after that of the Smithsonian Institution, and is used by other small presses in addition to Arion. The press's nonprofit branch, the Grabhorn Institute, was designated in 2001 by the National Trust for Historic Preservation as part of "the nation's irreplaceable historical and cultural legacy" under its Save America's Treasures program.

In 2001, Arion Press leased space in a former laundry in the Presidio. In 2024, it moved to the Fort Mason Center for Arts & Culture. The press has a gallery and offers tours. Hoyem retired in 2018. As of 2024, Blake Riley is lead printer and creative director.

== Publications ==
The press publishes up to four books each year, in limited editions of as few as 250. Most are reprints of literary works illustrated with original prints from prominent artists. The livre d'artiste series, launched in 1982, includes James Joyce's Ulysses illustrated with etchings by Robert Motherwell, the poetry of W. B. Yeats illustrated with etchings by Richard Diebenkorn, Jean Toomer's Cane illustrated with woodblock prints by Martin Puryear, and the poetry of Wallace Stevens illustrated by Jasper Johns. In 1979 it published a multi-volume edition of Moby-Dick on hand-made paper, illustrated with wood engravings by Barry Moser, which took 14 months to print; in 2006 in the San Francisco Chronicle John King characterized this and Arion's publications pairing comtemporary poets and artists as "among the most exquisitely printed books in the world". In 2003, the Minneapolis Star Tribune described Arion as "the nation's leading publisher of fine-press books".

In 2000, in celebration of the new millennium, Arion Press published a lectern edition of the Bible in 400 exemplars, which took two years to print. For its fifty-year anniversary in 2024, it is issuing Aesop's Fables with updated morals by Daniel Handler and illustrations by 15 artists. The presentation box by Kiki Smith illustrates "Belling the Cat", with a cast metal mouse sculpture and hidden bells.

Arion Press books are in the collections of the Museum of Modern Art, the Huntington Library, the Fine Arts Museums of San Francisco, Mechanics’ Institute and the British Library, among others. Two of the Press's books were honored among the one hundred great books of the 20th Century in the 1994 Museum of Modern Art exhibition One Hundred Years of Artists Books. Some of the purchasers of its works have included libraries, museums, collectors and subscribers.

== See also ==
- Book Club of California
