= Grabhorn Institute =

American nonprofit organization

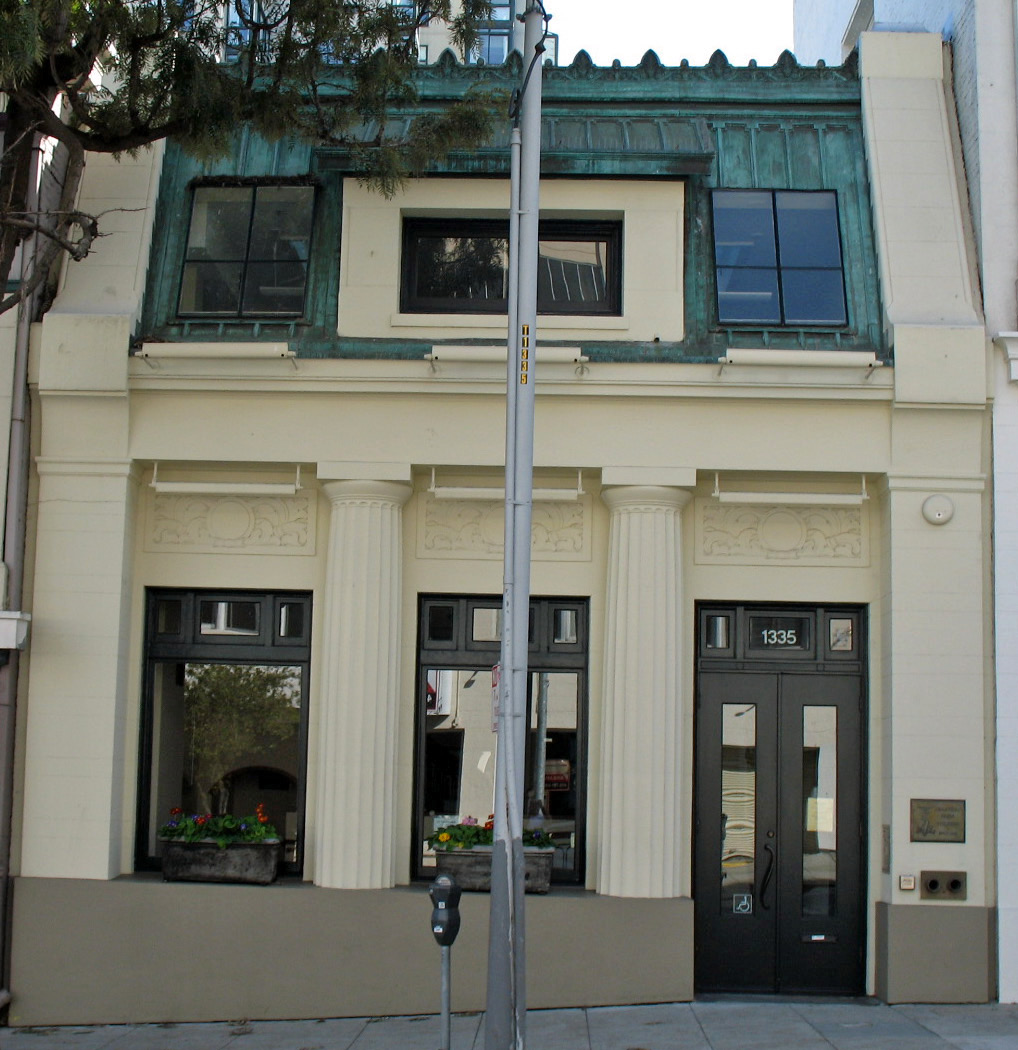
Graborn Press Building in San Francisco

The Grabhorn Institute is a nonprofit organization formed in October 2000 for the purpose of preserving and continuing the operation of one of the last integrated facilities for typefounding, letterpress printing, and bookbinding in the fine press tradition, as a living museum and educational and cultural center. It is named in honor of the brothers Edwin and Robert Grabhorn, who established the Grabhorn Press in San Francisco in 1920. The press was "one of the foremost producers of finely printed books in twentieth-century America." The Grabhorn Press Building is listed on the National Register of Historic Places in San Francisco, California.

== History ==
The Grabhorn Institute was founded when Andrew Hoyem, the proprietor of the Arion Press (the successor to the Grabhorn Press), and the type foundry M&H Type, facing eviction from their location in San Francisco in 2000, confronted the logistical and financial problem of moving over 140 tons of metal type plus heavy iron and steel printing presses and typecasting and bookbinding equipment to a suitable new facility. The press and foundry comprised a complete, traditional bookmaking facility, including the last large-scale hot metal type foundry in the country.

Support raised by the Grabhorn Institute enabled Arion and M&H to relocate to the Presidio of San Francisco as a cultural tenant in April 2001. In recognition of its work to preserve the typecasting and letterpress printing operation, the Grabhorn Institute was designated by the National Trust for Historic Preservation as part of "the nation's irreplaceable historical and cultural legacy" under its Save America's Treasures program.

The Grabhorn Institute received a California Heritage Council Award in 2002 for "preservation of the last fully functioning type foundry and integrated letterpress printing facility."

== Programming ==
Activities of the Grabhorn Institute include exhibits and lectures related to fine printing and book arts and an apprenticeship program to preserve the crafts of typecasting, letterpress printing, and bookbinding. It also conducts tours of the historic production facility, which includes the M & H Type foundry, established in 1915 with Monotype typecasting machines that came to San Francisco for the Panama–Pacific International Exposition; twelve letterpress printing presses; a bindery for hand bookbinding; and a large collection of rare typefaces passed down from the Grabhorn brothers and the noted San Francisco printer John Henry Nash.

According to Preservation, the magazine of the National Trust for Historic Preservation, "The collaboration among Arion Press, M&H Type, and the Grabhorn Institute is a model for preserving historic manufacturing equipment, keeping alive disappearing crafts, and printing beautiful artifacts—all in one enterprise."

== See also ==
- Jane Bissell Grabhorn
