= Lawrence Clark Powell =

American librarian and author

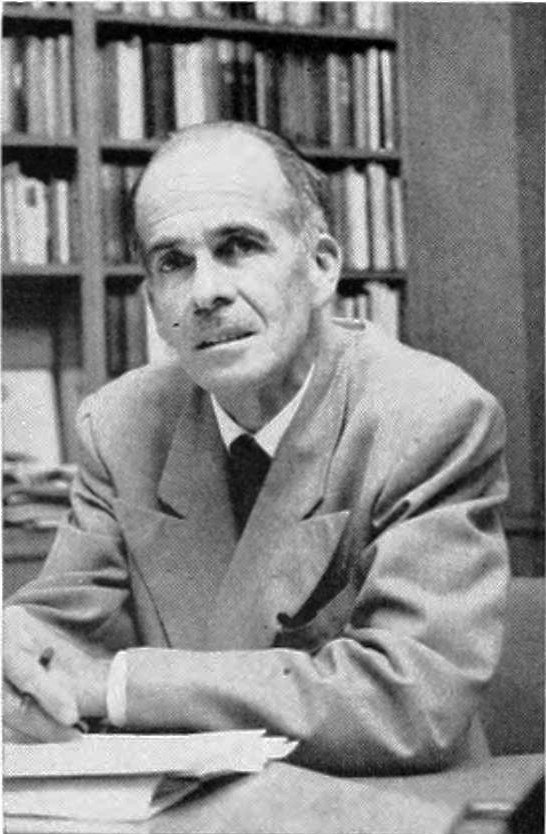
Lawrence Powell (1960)

Lawrence Clark Powell (September 3, 1906–March 14, 2001) was an American librarian, literary critic, bibliographer and author of more than 100 books. Powell "made a significant contribution to the literature of the library profession, but he also writes for the book-minded public. His interests are reflected in the subjects that recur throughout his writings; these are history and travel, especially concerning the American Southwest, rare books, libraries and librarianship, the book trade, and book collecting."

== Biography ==
Powell was born September 3, 1906 in Washington, D.C. of Quaker parents, G. Harold and Gertrude (Clark) Powell. His father was a general manager of the Sunkist Cooperative, and the family spent Powell's early winters in Riverside.

Powell's family moved to South Pasadena, California when he was five years old, and there he attended public schools, graduating from South Pasadena High School.

He received a B.A. from Occidental College in 1928. According to his obituary in the Los Angeles Times, "During the Depression, he worked as a shipping clerk at Vroman's Bookstore in Pasadena and for Fowler Books in Los Angeles and local rare bookstores until Los Angeles City Librarian Althea Hester Warren, in Powell's words, 'plucked me out of Jake Zeitlin's bookshop and sent me off to Berkeley.' " Powell later returned to Los Angeles to work for Warren at the Central Library in downtown Los Angeles.

He earned a doctorate from the University of Burgundy in Dijon (Université de Bourgogne) in 1932 (having written his dissertation on Robinson Jeffers), and a Certificate of Librarianship from the University of California, Berkeley in 1937.

In 1938, Powell started working at University of California, Los Angeles in the acquisitions department of the library. He was University Librarian at the UCLA Library from 1944 to 1961, and head librarian of the William Andrews Clark Memorial Library from 1944 until 1966.

He was the first dean of the School of Library Service at UCLA, which later merged to become the Graduate School of Education and Information Studies. He was also a lecturer in English at UCLA and a visiting professor at the Columbia University School of Library Service. Under his directorship, the UCLA library "quadrupled in size," numbering some 1.5 million volumes circa 1960. He acquired "such noted collections as Michael Sadleir's Victorian Fiction and the 80,000-volume library of C.K. Ogden, originator of Basic English." The Powell Library at UCLA is named for him.

Powell was a Guggenheim Fellow in Great Britain in 1950–51.

He had a monthly column on "Books of the West" for Westways magazine.

In 1977 he was awarded the Sir Thomas More Medal for Book Collecting, by the University of San Francisco Gleeson Library and the Gleeson Library Associates.

After retiring from UCLA in 1966, Powell moved to Tucson, Arizona in 1971, where—as Professor in Residence for nearly two decades—he was instrumental in the growth of the University of Arizona Graduate School of Library Science, now known as the University of Arizona School of Information Resources and Library Science. The University of Arizona Libraries special collections holds Powell's papers documenting his time in Tucson, and the Fay and Lawrence Clark Powell Endowment for Southwest Research continues to support Powell's interest in the geography of the southwest United States.

The Lawrence Clark Powell Memorial Lecture is held in Tucson annually in Powell's honor, with noted authors speaking about topics relevant to Powell's work, and Lifetime Achievement awards have been granted at the Memorial Lecture in prior years.

Powell was a president of the Bibliographical Society of America, the California Library Association, and the Zamorano Club of Los Angeles, and also a member of the Roxburghe Club of Los Angeles, the Caxton Club of Chicago, and the Grolier Club of New York.

In 1981 he was awarded American Library Association Honorary Membership.

He died at La Rosa Health Center in Tucson, Arizona at age 94. His wife, née Fay Ellen Shoemaker, died around 1991. The couple had two sons, one named Norman.

== Literary friendships ==
In 1934, Powell moved to Laguna Beach, California with his wife Fay, to live next door to M.F.K. Fisher, with whom he maintained a great correspondence and friendship. (The couple later lived in Malibu, until the family home—and the book collection contained therein—was destroyed in the 1978 Malibu fire.)

In the 1930s, Powell was a correspondent, friend and bibliographer for John Steinbeck as he composed Of Mice and Men and The Grapes of Wrath.

Henry Miller wrote in his book The Air-Conditioned Nightmare that L. C. Powell, "a humble, modest librarian at U.C.L.A." was (apart from Ed Ricketts) the only person whom Miller, during his journey across the United States, found "satisfied with his lot, adjusted to his environment, happy in his work, and representative of all that is best in the American tradition".

Miller also credited Powell for the suggestion that led him to write "The Books In My Life", and that work is dedicated to Powell.

== Selected works ==
- Powell, Lawrence Clark (December 1939). "The Functions of Rare Books". College & Research Libraries. 1 (1): 97–103. doi:10.5860/crl_01_01_97. hdl:2142/31360.
- Powell, Lawrence Clark (1951). Islands of Books. Los Angeles: Ward Ritchie Press .
- The Alchemy of Books (1954)
- Powell, Lawrence Clark (1954). The Alchemy of Books: And Other Essays and Addresses on Books & Writers. Los Angeles: Ward Ritchie Press.
- Powell, Lawrence Clark (1934). Robinson Jeffers: The Man and His Work. Los Angeles: Primavera Press.
- Philosopher Pickett
- Land of Fiction
- Heart of the Southwest
- A Southwestern Century
- The Malibu (with W.W. Robinson)
- Powell, Lawrence Clark (1958). A Passion for Books. Cleveland: World Publishing Company.
- Books in My Baggage (1960)
- The Little Package (1964)
- The Blue Train (1977)
- The River Between (1979)
- Southwestern Book Trails (1982)
- Eucalyptus Fair (1992)
- California Classics: The Creative Literature of the Golden State (1971)
- Photographs of the Southwest (1976) (with Ansel Adams)
- Powell, Lawrence Clark (1968). Fortune & Friendship: An Autobiography. New York: R. R. Bowker Company.
- Life Goes On: Twenty More Years of Fortune and Friendship (1986)
- Winter Crossing 1952 - Travel Notes from a Bygone era (1986)
