= Ward Ritchie =

American printer and author (1905–1996)

Harry "Ward" Ritchie
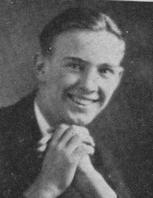
- Ritchie as high school senior, 1924
- Born: June 15, 1905; Los Angeles, California, United States
- Died: January 24, 1996 (aged 90); Laguna Beach, California, United States
- Occupations: Printer, book designer, book collector, writer
- Partner: Gloria Stuart (1983–1996)

Harry "Ward" Ritchie (Los Angeles, California June 15, 1905 – Laguna Beach, California January 24, 1996) was an American printer, book designer, book collector and writer of around 100 books. He was part of the "Golden Age" of fine printing that took place during the 1920s and 1930s in Southern California. Ritchie was also part of the Artists of the Arroyo Seco community.

== Early life and career ==
Ritchie grew up in South Pasadena and attended the Marengo Avenue School, South Pasadena High School, and graduated in 1928 from Occidental College in Northeast Los Angeles. After a brief stint in law school at USC, Ritchie turned his attention to printing, his true passion. He enrolled at Frank Wiggins Trade School (now Los Angeles Trade–Technical College). In 1930, Ritchie apprenticed in Paris with the renowned artist and printer François-Louis Schmied.

== Career ==
Returning to South Pasadena, Ritchie co-founded, along with fellow printer Grant Dahlstrom and bookseller Jacob "Jake" Zeitlin, the Rounce & Coffin Club. This club was created as a less formal alternative to the Zamorano Club, where other bibliophiles gathered in Los Angeles, and to which he was later welcomed in 1934. The following year, he established the Ward Ritchie Press, through which he published thousands of books, over 750 designed by himself; his output included works by poets Robinson Jeffers, Carl Sandburg, Archibald MacLeish, Carlyle MacIntyre, librarian Lawrence Clark Powell, novelist Alexandre Dumas, and many others.

In 1987 he gave the Englehard Lecture on Fine Printing: The Los Angeles Tradition at the Center for the Book at the Library of Congress.

He was a member of the Book Club of California.

== Personal life and death ==
In 1983, Ritchie became romantically involved with film actress Gloria Stuart, who was inspired by him to design her own hand-printed books under the imprint Imprenta Glorias. Ritchie maintained a close relationship with Stuart until his death.

Ritchie died of pancreatic cancer in Laguna Beach, California on January 24, 1996.
