= Jacob Zeitlin =

American poet and bookseller (1902-1987)

Jacob Israel "Jake" Zeitlin
- Born: November 4, 1902; Racine, Wisconsin, U.S.
- Died: August 30, 1987 (aged 84); Los Angeles, California, U.S.
- Occupation: Bookseller · Publisher · Collector · Poet · Intellectual
- Years active: 1925–1987
- Known for: Founder of Zeitlin & Ver Brugge Booksellers; co‑founder of Primavera Press and Rounce & Coffin Club; central figure in L.A. literary and print arts scene
- Spouse: Josephine Ver Brugge (m. 1939)
- Children: Four

Jacob Israel Zeitlin (November 4, 1902 – August 30, 1987) was an American bookseller, publisher, collector, poet and intellectual in Los Angeles in the mid-twentieth century.

== Early life and career ==
Jacob Zeitlin was born in Racine, Wisconsin, but moved with his family to Fort Worth, Texas in his childhood and to Los Angeles in 1925. For many years, Zeitlin lived in the Echo Park area of Los Angeles. He opened his first bookshop in 1928, on Hope Street near 6th Street in downtown Los Angeles, and over the years moved his shop a number of times, its final location being in a converted barn on La Cienega Boulevard. He founded the Primavera Press, to produce fine printed books, and was a co-founder of the Rounce & Coffin Club, which supported and encouraged fine printing in Southern California for many years. During his sixty years as a rare book seller, he, along with his many friends and associates, known as the "Zeitlin circle," was a significant force in the cultural and intellectual life of Los Angeles. In 1963, he testified in a California Supreme Court obscenity hearing on Henry Miller's novel Tropic of Cancer.

Zeitlin was one of the first people to exhibit the woodcuts of fellow Echo Park resident Paul Landacre and the photographs of Edward Weston, as well as the first in America to exhibit the work of German artist Käthe Kollwitz. Zeitlin was also a poet and the editor of Opinion, a short-lived but influential Angeleno intellectual journal. A liberal in politics, Zeitlin was the campaign manager for Helen Gahagan Douglas' Senatorial campaign. He also lobbied against the La Cienega Boulevard highway, bringing artistic friends such as actor and art dealer Joan Ankrum to Sacramento to protest.

== Personal life and death ==
Zeitlin was married to Josephine Ver Brugge, who became his business partner, and together they had four children. He died on August 30, 1987 in West Hollywood, California.

== Archival collections ==
Zeitlin's extensive archives and papers are held at the UCLA Library Special Collections.
