= Fine press =

Branch of publishing

In printing and publishing, the fine press are printers and publishers publishing books and other printed matter determined to be of exceptional intrinsic quality and artistic taste, including both commercial and private presses.

== History ==
As part of the Arts and Crafts movement in the late 19th and early 20th centuries, the Englishman William Morris wanted to counter the industrialization of culture through a revival of craft in printing, printmaking, and publishing. One of the books he published was the Kelmscott Chaucer. Soon, fine presses began to spring up in the United States as well; the most prominent was the Roycroft Press. Los Angeles was a center of the fine press movement, particularly centered on the Ward Ritchie press. In the 1920s, San Francisco became known for the elegant publications of John Henry Nash, and likewise became a fine press center on the West Coast.

== List of fine presses ==
=== United States ===
- Alderbrink Press (1897–1928?)
- Arion Press, San Francisco (1974–present)
- Blue Sky Press (1899–1906)
- Clerk's Press (1908–1919)
- Colt Press, San Francisco
- Cranbrook Press (1900–1902)
- Easton Press
- Elston Press (1900–1904)
- Grabhorn Press, San Francisco
- John Henry Nash, San Francisco
- Marion Press (1896–1931)
- The Mosher Press (1891–1923+) Set up by Thomas Bird Mosher in 1891, in Portland, Maine
- Philosopher Press (1896–1904)
- Plantin Press, Los Angeles. Founded by Saul and Lillian Marks, in 1931
- Roycroft Press (1896–1915+) Set up by Elbert Hubbard in 1895
- Saunders Studio Press, Claremont. Founded by Lynne and Ruth Thompson Saunders in 1927
- Trovillion Press at the Sign of the Silver Horse Set up by Hal W. Trovillion in Herrin, Illinois, in 1908
- Hammer Creek Press (1950–1962)
- Thornwillow Press, New York (1985–present)
- Ward Ritchie Press

=== United Kingdom ===
- Ashendene Press (1894–1935)
- Daniel Press Oxford (1874–1903)
- Doves Press (1900–1916) - Founded by T. J. Cobden-Sanderson and Emery Walker
- Eragny Press (1894–1914)
- Essex House Press (1898–1910)
- Fine Press Poetry (founded 2013) by Andrew J Moorhouse
- Folio Society - Founded by Charles Ede in 1947
- Golden Cockerel Press - Founded by Harold Midgley Taylor in 1920
- Gregynog Press (1922-) - Founded by Gwendoline and Margaret Davies
- Kelmscott Press (1891–1898) - Set up by William Morris in 1891
- Kynoch Press (1876–1981) - English-based fine press in Witton, Birmingham, founded as a company press for Kynoch, a British ammunition manufacturer.
- Nonesuch Press - Founded in 1922 by Francis and Vera Meynell, and David Garnett
- The Press of Gaetano Polidori
- Rampant Lions Press (1924–2008)
- Strawberry Hill Press of Horace Walpole
- Vale Press (1896–1905)

=== Continental Europe ===
- Ad insigne pinus (1594–1619) In Augsburg
- AIZ Dosije (1988–Present) In Belgrade

=== Australia ===
- Finlay Press founded and operated by Phil Day (artist) and Ingeborg Hansen in Australia. 1997–2009.

== See also ==
- Arts and Crafts movement
- Private press
- Small press
