= Private press =

Type of book publisher

Private press publishing, with respect to books, is an endeavor performed by craft-based expert or aspiring artisans, either amateur or professional, who, among other things, print and build books, typically by hand, with emphasis on design, graphics, layout, fine printing, binding, covers, paper, stitching, and the like.

== Description ==
The term "private press" is not synonymous with "fine press", "small press", or "university press" – though there are similarities. One similarity shared by all is that they need not meet higher commercial thresholds of commercial presses. Private presses, however, often have no profit motive. A similarity shared with fine and small presses, but not university presses, is that for various reasons – namely quality – production quantity is often limited. University presses are typically more automated. A distinguishing quality of private presses is that they enjoy sole discretion over literary, scientific, artistic, and aesthetic merits. Criteria for other types of presses vary. From an aesthetic perspective, critical acclaim and public appreciation of artisans' works from private presses is somewhat analogous to that of luthiers' works of fine string instruments and bows.

== Etymological perspective ==
The private press movement, and its renowned body of work – relative to the larger world of book arts in Western civilization – is narrow and recent. From one perspective, collections relating to book arts date back to before the High Middle Ages. As an illustration of scope and influence, a 1980 exhibition at the Catholic University of America, "The Monastic Imprint," highlighted the influence of book arts and textual scholarship from 1200 to 1980, displaying hundreds of diplomas, manuscript codices, incunabula, printed volumes, and calligraphic and private press ephemera. The displays focused on five areas: (1) Medieval Monasticism, Spirituality, and Scribal Culture, A.D. 1200–1500; (2) Early Printing and the Monastic Scholarly Tradition, ca. 1450–1600; (3) Early modern Monastic Printing and Scholarly Publishing, A.D. 1650–1800; (4) Modern Survivals: Monastic Scriptoria, Private Presses, and Academic Publishing, 1800–1980.

The earliest descriptive references to private presses were by Bernardus A. Mallinckrodt of Mainz, Germany, in De ortu ac progressu artis typographicae dissertatio historica (Cologne, 1639). The earliest in-depth writing about private presses was by Adam Heinrich Lackmann (de) (1694–1754) in Annalium Typographicorum, Selecta Quaedam Capita (Hamburg, 1740).

== Private press movement ==
=== By location ===
==== United Kingdom ====
The term "private press" is often used to refer to a movement in book production which flourished around the turn of the 20th century under the influence of the scholar-artisans William Morris, Sir Emery Walker and their followers. The movement is often considered to have begun with the founding of Morris' Kelmscott Press in 1890, following a lecture on printing given by Walker at the Arts and Crafts Exhibition Society in November 1888. Morris decried that the Industrial Revolution had ruined man's joy in work and that mechanization, to the extent that it has replaced handicraft, had brought ugliness with it. Those involved in the private press movement created books by traditional printing and binding methods, with an emphasis on the book as a work of art and manual skill, as well as a medium for the transmission of information. Morris was greatly influenced by medieval codices and early printed books and the 'Kelmscott style' had a great, and not always positive, influence on later private presses and commercial book-design. The movement was an offshoot of the Arts and Crafts movement, and represented a rejection of the cheap mechanised book-production methods which developed in the Victorian era. The books were made with high-quality materials (handmade paper, traditional inks and, in some cases, specially designed typefaces), and were often bound by hand. Careful consideration was given to format, page design, type, illustration and binding, to produce a unified whole. The movement dwindled during the worldwide depression of the 1930s, as the market for luxury goods evaporated. Since the 1950s, there has been a resurgence of interest, especially among artists, in the experimental use of letterpress printing, paper-making and hand-bookbinding in producing small editions of 'artists' books', and among amateur (and a few professional) enthusiasts for traditional printing methods and for the production 'values' of the private press movement.

==== New Zealand ====
In New Zealand university private presses have been significant in the private press movement. Private presses are active at three New Zealand universities: Auckland (Holloway Press), Victoria (Wai-te-ata Press) and Otago (Otakou Press).

==== North America ====
A 1982 Newsweek article about the rebirth of the hand press movement asserted that Harry Duncan was "considered the father of the post-World War II private-press movement." Will Ransom has been credited as the father of American private press historiographers.

=== Selected history ===
==== Quality control ====
Beyond aesthetics, private presses, historically, have served other needs. John Hunter (1728–1793), a Scottish surgeon and medical researcher, established a private press in 1786 at his house at 13 Castle Street, Leicester Square, in West End of London, in an attempt to prevent unauthorized publication of cheap and foreign editions of his works. His first book from his private press: A Treatise on the Venereal Disease. One thousand copies of the first edition were printed.

==== Academics ====
Porter Garnett (1871–1951), of Carnegie Mellon University, was an exponent of the anti-industrial values of the great private presses – namely those of Kelmscott, Doves, and Ashendene. Following Garnett's inspirational proposal to Carnegie Mellon, Garnett designed and inaugurated on April 7, 1923, the institute's Laboratory Press – for the purpose of teaching printing, which he believed was the first private press devoted solely for that purpose. The press closed in 1935.

=== Selected examples ===
==== United States ====
- Abattoir Editions, founded by Harry Alvin Duncan (1916–1997), subsidized by the University of Nebraska Omaha
- Appledore Private Press, set-up in 1867 by William James Linton at Appledore (his house), in Hamden, Connecticut
- Arion Press, founded 1974 by Andrew Hoyem in San Francisco
- Ashantilly Press, founded 1954 in Darien, Georgia, by William Greaner Haynes, Jr. (1908–2001)
- Bird & Bull Press, founded 1952 by Henry Martin Morris (born 1925), located in Newtown, Pennsylvania
- Black Rock Press, founded 1965 by Kenneth J. Carpenter at the University of Nevada, Reno
- William Murray Cheney (1907–2002) of Los Angeles
- Gehenna Press, founded 1942 by Leonard Baskin (1922–2000) in New Haven, Connecticut; in the late 1940s, Baskin moved it to Northampton, Massachusetts
- Hammer Creek Press, founded 1954 by John Strobel Fass (1890–1973) in The Bronx
- The Mosher Press, set up by Thomas Bird Mosher in 1891 in Portland, Maine
- The Perishable Press, founded 1964 by Walter Hamady in Detroit
- Roycroft Press set-up in 1895 by Elbert Hubbard in East Aurora, New York
- Something Else Press, founded 1963 in New York City by Dick Higgins; the press moved to West Glover, Vermont
- Stone Wall Press (1957–2013) of Karl Kimber Merker (1932–2013), Iowa City
- Stratford Press of Cincinnati, Ohio (1920–1965), was the private press of Elmer Frank Gleason (1882–1965)
- Trovillion Press at the Sign of the Silver Horse, set up 1908 by Hal W. Trovillion (né Hal Weeden Trovillion; 1879–1967) in Herrin, Illinois

==== Canada ====
- M. Bernard Loates, A Private Press, founded in 1968
- Locks' Press, founded in 1979 in Brisbane, Australia, by Fred Lock, PhD (né Frederick Peter Lock; born 1948), and wife (an artist), Margaret Lock (née Margaret Helen Capper); in 1987, they moved to Kingston, Ontario

==== Ireland ====
- Dun Emer Press, founded by Elizabeth Yeats in 1903

==== United Kingdom ====
- Daniel Press in Oxford from 1874 to 1903
- Doves Press, founded by T. J. Cobden Sanderson and Emery Walker in 1900
- Essex House Press, founded in 1897 by Charles Robert Ashbee (1863–1942) in London
- Golden Cockerel Press, founded 1920 in Waltham St Lawrence by Harold Midgley Taylor (1893–1925)
- Gregynog Press, founded 1922 near Newtown, Powys, Wales, by Gwendoline (1882–1951) and Margaret Davies (1884–1963)
- Happy Dragons' Press founded in 1969 in North Essex
- Hogarth Press founded in 1917 by authors Leonard Woolf and Virginia Woolf in Richmond
- Jericho Press, founded 1985 in Lancaster by "Chip" Coakley, PhD (né James Farwell Coakley)
- Kelmscott Press, set up by William Morris in 1891
- Kynoch Press, a company-owned press that produced artisan-type books in private editions, founded in 1876, closed 1981
- Nonesuch Press, founded in 1922 in London by Sir Francis Meynell (1891–1975), his 2nd wife, Vera Meynell (née Vera Rosalind Wynn Mendel; 1895–1947), and David Garnett (1892–1981)
- Officina Typographica (the namesake of a bygone constellation), established in 1963 by Stanisław Gliwa (pl) (1910–1986), a Polish expatriate living in London
- Gaetano Polidori's Private Press in London c. 1800
- Rampant Lions Press, founded 1924 in Cambridge by Will Carter (né William Nicholas Carter; 1912–2001), who was 12, and continued by his son Sebastian until 2008
- Stanbrook Abbey Press, which was revived by Dames Hildelith Cumming and Felicitas Corrigan
- Strawberry Hill Press — the Officina Arbuteana — of Horace Walpole

==== France ====
- Black Sun Press, founded 1927 by Harry Crosby (1898–1929) and Caresse Crosby in Paris
- Contact Publishing Company, founded 1923 by Robert McAlmon (1895–1956) in Paris
- Harrison of Paris, founded 1930 by Monroe Wheeler (1899–1988) and Barbara Harrison Wescott (1904–1977) in Paris
- Hours Press, founded 1928 in La Chapelle-Réanville, Normandy, by Nancy Cunard (1896–1965)
- Plain Edition Press, founded around 1930 by Alice B. Toklas (1877–1967) and operated by her and Gertrude Stein (1874–1946) in Paris

==== Asia-Pacific ====
- Finlay Press, founded 1997 by Ingeborg Hansen and Phil Day at Goulburn, New South Wales
- Holloway Press, established 1994 by poet Alan Loney at the University of Auckland

==== Western Asia ====
- The Private Press of Ariel Wardi (surname alt spelling, converting Polish phonological use of "W" to English "V" – "Vardi"), established 1989 in Jerusalem; Ariel (born 1929) is the son of Haim Wardi, PhD (ne Rosenfeld; 1901–1975) (he)

=== Opponents ===
William Addison Dwiggins (1880–1956), a commercial artist, is lauded for high quality work, namely with Alfred Knopf. In contrast to many first-rate book designers joining private presses, he refused. Historian Paul Shaw explained, "He had no patience with those who insisted on retaining hand processes in printing and publishing in the belief that they were inherently superior to machine processes." Dwiggins' "principal concern ultimately centered on readers and their reading needs, esthetic as well as financial. [His] goal was to make books that were beautiful, functional, and inexpensive." Ironically, he went on to form the Püterschein-Hingham private press with Dorothy Abbe in 1947.

== Gallery ==
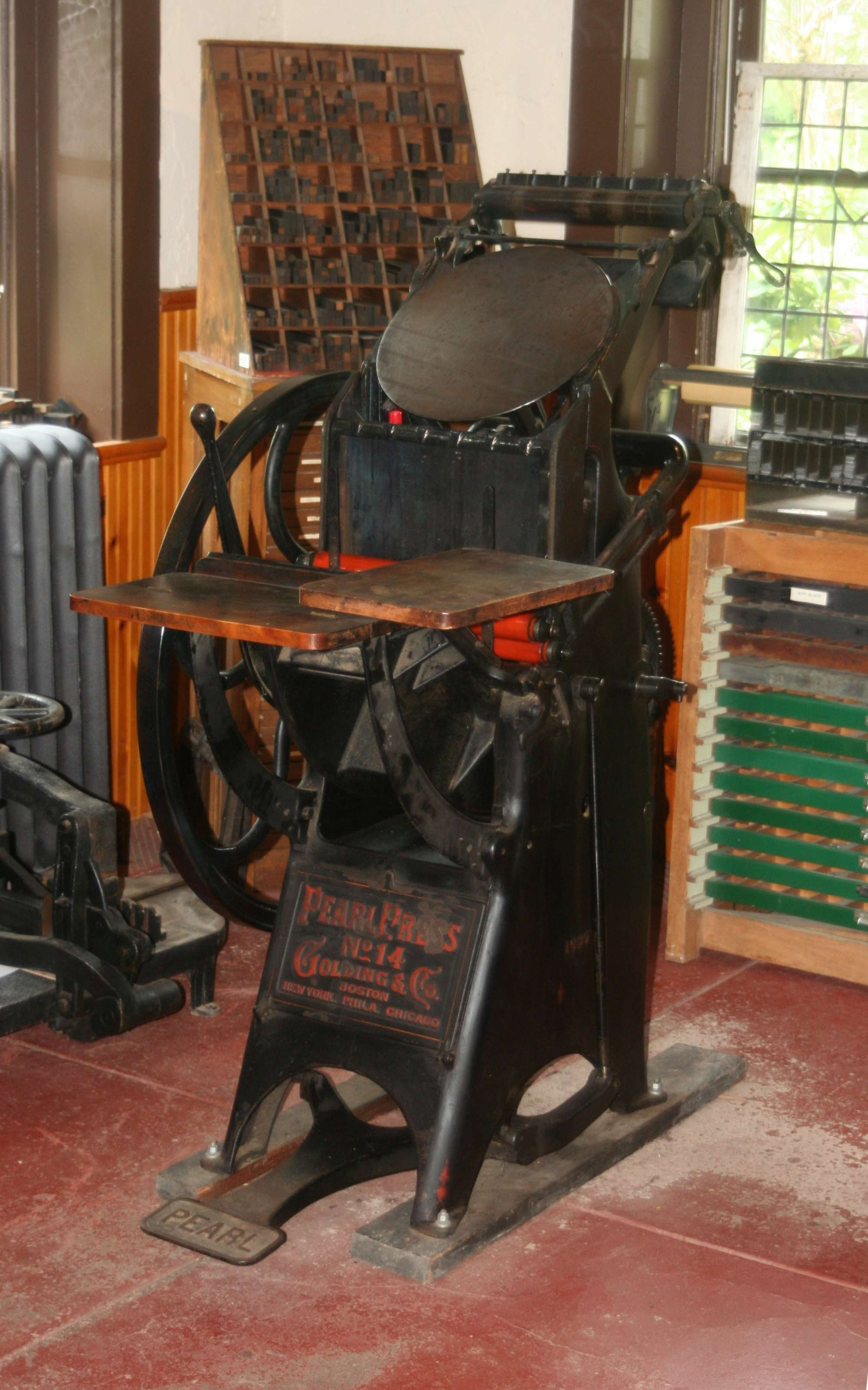
Roycroft printing press

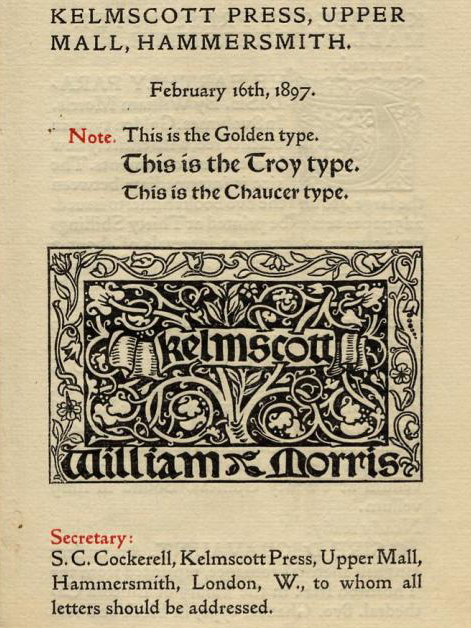
Kelmscott Press font styles

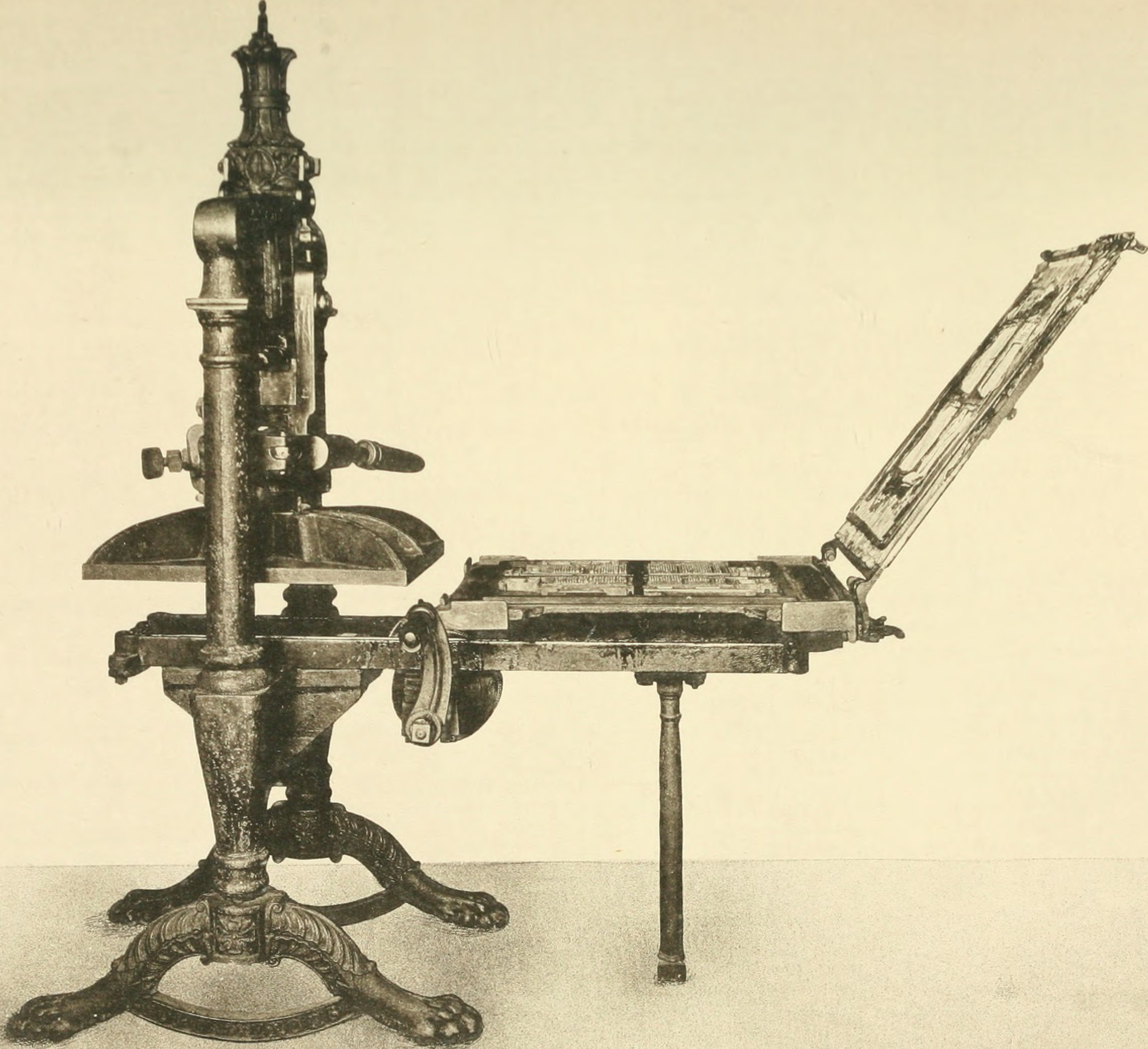
Albion press used by the Daniel Press

== See also ==
- Alternative media
- Arts and Crafts movement
- Bookbinding
- Fine press
- Israeli printmaking
- Small press
- Private Internet connections vs. onion routing
- Private Libraries Association
- City Lights Bookstore of San Francisco
