= Loates =

Loates is the surname of the following people:

- Martin Glen Loates (born 1945), Canadian artist
- Murphy Bernard Loates (born 1945), Canadian artist, lithographer and publisher
- Sam Loates (1865–1932), British horse racing jockey
- Tommy Loates (1867–1910), British horse racing jockey, brother of Sam
