= Rampant Lion =

Rampant Lion may refer to:

- Lion (heraldry)#Attitudes, the heraldic depiction of a lion standing erect with forepaws raised
- Rampant Lion, Manchester, a listed former public house in Manchester, England
- Rampant Lions Press, a British letterpress printing firm active from 1924 to 2008
