= Margaret Hickey =

Margaret Hickey may refer to:

- Maggie Hickey (born 1946), Australian politician
- Margaret A. Hickey (1902–1994), American attorney, journalist and women's rights activist
- Margaret Hickey (potter) (ca. 1865-1932), companion and housekeeper of Mary Louise McLaughlin
