= Stratford Press (Cincinnati) =

Former American printing house

The Stratford Press of Cincinnati was the private press of Elmer Frank Gleason (1882–1965), who hand-crafted non-commercial books for libraries, literary clubs, academic institutions, philanthropists, artists, collectors, patrons, and friends.

== History ==
The Stratford Press, for commercial purposes, was founded in 1913 in Worcester, Massachusetts, by Thomas F. Johnson (born 1880) and Elmer Frank Gleason for the purpose of producing "high-grade commercial and society printing." Gleason filed for bankruptcy in 1914.

After the failed commercial attempt in Worcester, Gleason began building books, privately in Cincinnati under the name, Stratford Press, around 1920, as a hobby – during the arts and Crafts movement, and in particular, the private press movement throughout Britain, Europe, and America. Gleason – lauded as a talented artisan in the craft of book building and design – printed and bound his books by hand. Some of his works have flourished in literary, art, and history circles, not only for design and construction, but also for substantive content. An exemplary specimen of his work is found in a booklet, Clara Chipman Newton: a memorial tribute, released November 1, 1938, in Cincinnati.

== Selected acclaim ==
James Lamar Weygand, in 1965, authored and published a critical-biographical essay and a bibliography, Elmer F. Gleason and the Stratford Press: A History & Bibliography, wherein he asserted that the Stratford Press "was one of the most significant private presses of the Midwestern United States." He pointed out that, in nearly a half-century of creative activity, Gleason contributed substantially to typographical standards both in the Ohio Valley and in the nation.

== Selected works ==
- Clara Chipman Newton: A Memorial Tribute (small booklet; limited edition, privately distributed)
  Compiling committee: Florence Murdoch (maiden; 1887–1977) (chairman); Eunice Resor (née Eunice Swift Thoms; 1871–1960); Susan Galbraith (née Susan Clark Neff; 1877–1970); Emma Mendenhall (1873–1964); Elizabeth Kellogg (née Elizabeth Rockey Kellogg; 1870–1967)
  The booklet was hand designed, printed, and bound by the Stratford Press (the private press of Elmer Frank Gleason; 1882–1965; at his home in Cincinnati); co-publishers: (i) Cincinnati Woman's Club, (ii) The Loring Andrews Company, (iii) The Stratford Press; released November 1, 1938; OCLC 2728836

== Elmer Frank Gleason ==
Elmer Frank Gleason, professionally in Cincinnati, was head of layout and design for the McDonald Printing Company.

== The name, Stratford (disambiguation) ==
Stratford-upon-Avon is the hometown of Shakespeare. Stratford is also a metropolitan district in the London Borough of Newham in Greater London. The name "Stratford" is contained in several book-literature company oriented names, including

(i) The Stratford Press Company of Cleveland, founded in 1911 by William Joseph Raddatz (1880–1940), dissolved in 1925, and (ii) The Stratford Company, Publishers, Boston, founded around 1915, which published The Stratford Journal ("an international magazine") (Vol. 1, No. 1, Autumn 1916, to Vol. 6, No. 1, January-March 1920), and (iii) the American Book-Stratford Press, Inc., founded by Louis Satenstein (1882–1964) in New York City as the American Book Bindery Company.
