= Bibelot =

Bibelot may refer to:

- The Bibelot, a yearly literary anthology (1895–1914), and The Bibelots, a series of 29 midget reprints of English classics
- Bibelot Mansur (born 1978), Mexican actress
