= Alan Loney =

New Zealand writer, poet, editor, publisher and letterpress printer

Alan Perress Loney is a New Zealand writer, poet, editor, publisher and letterpress printer. His work has been published by University and private presses in New Zealand, Australia and North America. His own presses have printed and published many of New Zealand's most noted poets. He has also produced books himself, and in collaboration with artists and printmakers in New Zealand and overseas. Originally living and working in New Zealand, he now resides in Melbourne, Australia.

== Early life and work ==
Born in Lower Hutt, New Zealand in 1940, the eldest of eight children in a working-class family, he left school at the age of fifteen. Music provided him with a youthful entry into Wellington's bohemian and intellectual scene as he played the drums in several bands including the University Jazz Club.

In his early twenties, under the influence of poet George South, Loney turned from music to poetry and started writing. His first volume of poems The Bare Remembrance was published by Caveman Press in Dunedin in 1971. After moving from Dunedin to Christchurch in 1974, he set up his own private press, Hawk Press. As well as printing the work of younger New Zealand poets, he produced a second volume of his own work, Dear Mondrian, which won a New Zealand Book Award in 1976. By the time Hawk Press closed in 1983 it had published over twenty poets.

== Influences ==
Inspired by his discovery of Charles Olson's 'Maximus Poems' and new ideas on poetics such as those promoted by the L=A=N=G=U=A=G=E poets, Loney's own work continued to develop along progressive lines. He befriended American poet Robert Creeley when Creeley toured NZ in 1976 and published Hello by Creeley, a work that reflected on the poet's experiences in New Zealand. (Creeley was heavily involved with Olson and was part of a school called the Black Mountain Poets). This early contact with contemporary American writing surfaced in other ways than in Loney's own work. In 1982 and 1983 he edited the only three numbers of a quarterly literary magazine "Parallax: a journal of postmodern literature and art". His contacts as an editor and publisher and his own subsequent writing led to later travels to the USA where he read at the State University of New York at Buffalo and the University of Pennsylvania, spoke at seminars and gave a talk in the Threads Talk Series. Several recordings of Loney's lectures and readings are available on PennSound

== Poetry and printing ==
Running parallel to this work as a poet, his printing developed after moving back to Wellington with a new press called Black Light in 1987. Here he expanded his range of publications and experimented with typographical design. Also in Wellington, he founded The Book Arts Society in 1990 which had a wide range of members united by their interest in and concern for the ‘book as form’. Under this umbrella, printers, designers, writers, collectors, calligraphers, paper-makers and binders joined a program of exhibitions, workshops, talks and seminars.

Despite his truncated formal education, Loney was awarded the University of Auckland's Literary Fellowship in 1992 and was subsequently employed as a tutor in the English Department. While at the university he and Associate Professor Peter Simpson set up the Holloway Press using equipment donated to the University by printer Ron Holloway of the Griffin Press. At the Hollow Press, Loney attempted to concentrate on finely printed books, often in limited editions, of historical, literary or academic interest. Involvement with the University included convening its first Conference on the History of the Book in 1995. In addition to his poetry, the University also has published The Falling, a memoir referring to his childhood and the loss of a friend in a rail disaster.

At this time Loney founded a new literary journal, A Brief Description of the Whole World (the title based on a publication of 1634 by Bishop George Abbott) on an unconventional model. Selected writers, several of whom were not regularly published in New Zealand literary magazines, were invited to submit whatever they wished with absolutely minimal direction or interference by the editor. He produced 9 issues and a final double-issue 10 & 11 from 1995 to 1998. The first eight numbers contain a series of editorial essays in defence of marginalised writing in New Zealand. In 1998 he resigned from the University of Auckland and moved to Melbourne, where he was offered an Honorary Fellowship (2002–2006) at the Australia Centre, University of Melbourne.

== Move to Australia ==
In Melbourne he met his partner Miriam Morris (a viola da gamba player and cello teacher) and established Electio Editions to print works by himself and others including poet Chris Wallace-Crabbe and artist Bruno Leti. The bigger literary community and audience in Australia provided him with more opportunities to be published.

Back in New Zealand his poetry, prose and printing began to be recognised and the University of Otago granted him a position as Printer in Residence in 2008 while the Christchurch Art Gallery and Gus Fisher Gallery have featured his works in exhibitions. Having spent many years printing the works of other poets, Loney is now being printed by other fine press printers: Tara McLeod at Pear Tree Press (Auckland); Inge Bruggeman for Granary Books (New York) and her own Ink-A! Press (Oregon); and Scott King at Red Dragonfly Press (Minnesota).

== Bibliography ==
POETRY: Heidegger's bicycle: Notebooks 2015 - 2017 (Paekakariki Press, 2017), Day's eye, 2008; Nowhere to go & other poems, 2007; Black & White Book, 2005; Fragmenta nova, 2005; Sidetracks: Notebooks 1976 1991, 1998, Envoy (with pageworks by Mark Wills), 1996; The Erasure Tapes, 1994; Missing Parts, 1992; Shorter Poems 1963 1977, 1979; dear Mondrian, 1976; The Bare Remembrance, 1971.

PROSE: Each new book, 2008; The Printing of a Masterpiece, 2008; Meditatio : the printer printed : manifesto, 2004; Bruno Leti, Survey, Artists Books 1982–2003, 2003; The Falling: a memoir, 2001; Reading/Saying/Making: Selected Essays 1977–2000, 2001; & the Ampersand (an essay on typography), 1990.

== Summary ==
Loney's career as a printer has moved from traditional letterpress printing and publishing poetry in small and affordable editions to expensive fine press books employing his own and others’ design and illustrative skills. As a writer, he has spanned the period when the theories and techniques of postmodernism have contested older paradigms and forms of literature, and been at the forefront of critical and creative writing in Australia.
