= The Kynoch Press =

English printing house

The Kynoch Press was an English-based fine press in Witton, Birmingham, founded in 1876 as a company press for Kynoch, a British manufacturer of ammunition. Initially, the press was used to print packaging. The press closed in 1981.

== History ==
To manage publicity, the company set it up as a fine press, which, when Kynoch became Imperial Chemical Industries Limited (ICI) in 1929, continued as a division and kept its name, The Kynoch Press. The Kynoch Press not only handled the firm's printing, but performed independent work, operating at times like a small press, and at other times like a fine press, and yet at other times like a private press.

From 1900 to 1921, H. Donald Hope brought the press recognition; and from 1922 to 1933, the press commissioned leading artists, including Eric Ravilious and Tirzah Garwood. During this time, Herbert Simon (1898–1974) (de), who from 1919 to 1922 had worked for William Edwin Rudge, expanded on Hope's achievements, until 1933, when he moved-on to join his brother, Oliver Simon, OBE (1895–1956), at the Curwen Press. The following four years, from 1934 to 1938, were unfruitful under the leadership of H. V. Davis. Then, from 1938 to 1945, Michael Clapham (1912–2002) oversaw the press during sparse years of World War II and managed to launch Endeavor, a quarterly scientific journal; then, from 1945 to 1958, John "Jock" Kennedy brought the press to the forefront of the industry by focusing on design; then, from 1959 to 1976, Wallis Heath was managing director and sought, through exporting and computer lithographic advances, to find a niche for the midsized publisher within the changing market; then, from 1976 to 1981, Harry Wainwright was managing director, but was directed to sell the press. In 1979, Wainwright found a suitable buyer, Gilmer and Dean, but the press closed in 1981 under the duress of a failed management buyout due in part to the union's unwillingness to accept any layoffs. The press closed in 1981.

== Selected outside work ==
- Sir Philip Sidney, Astrophel and Stella, The Kynoch Press (1931); OCLC 248280729
- Racecourse and Hunting Field, a limited edition centenary account in doggerel verse of
1. The Doncaster St. Leger (poem; 10 pages), by Sir Francis Hastings Doyle, and
2. Melton in 1830 (poem; 9 pages) probably by Bernal Osborne

Published by Constable & Company, Ltd.; printed by The Kynoch Press (1930); edited and introduction by Samuel Joseph Looker (1888–1965), color drawings by Lesley Blanch
Octavo, 58 pages, 750 copies, maroon cloth; other editions: Richard R. Smith, Inc., publications, of New York (né Richard Roy Smith; 1885–1957) (acquired Ray Long & Richard R. Smith, Inc., in 1959 by William Lathrop Bauhan; 1929–2006), produced an American edition in 1931
The poems illustrate the spirit of horse racing at (i) the St Leger Stakes at the Doncaster Racecourse in South Yorkshire and (ii) the Melton Racecourse, next to Burton Lazars, Leicestershire, which was ploughed-up during World War I

- Endeavor, a scientific journal founded in 1942
- A Brief Survey of Printing – History and Practice, by Stanley Morison and Holbrook Jackson, published in American by Alfred A. Knopf, New York; printed in England by the Kynoch Press (1923); OCLC 52394392
- A Catalogue of the Collection of Italian and Other Maiolica, Mediaeval English Pottery, Dutch, Spanish and French Faience, and Other Ceramic Wares: Formed by William Ridout of London and Toronto (né William Roland Umfreville Ridout; 1879–1933) by his sister, Miss F. U. Ridout (Florence Umfreville Ridout; 1876–1962), with the help of William Bowyer Honey (1889–1956); OCLC 166529579, 938410804

== Selected in-house work ==
- I.C.I. Magazine (1920– ), Kynoch Press; OCLC 33911049, 638013737

== Marketing works ==
- Specimens of Types In Use At The Kynoch Press, The Kynoch Press (1934); OCLC 66564343, 12214519, 561154440; OCLC 16863437

Supplement No. 1: Types added during 1934 (1935), pps. 161–172
Supplement No. 2: Types added during 1935 (1936), pps. 173–180
Supplement No. 3: Types added since 1935 (1938), pps. 181–183
Harry Carter, then working for The Kynoch Press, sent a copy to Jan van Krimpen in 1934 (letter from Museum Enschedé: "Carter to Van Krimpen," February 1934). Carter was probably responsible for the layout of the specimens.

== Selected personnel ==
- Harry Graham Carter (1901–1982), a notable typographer, was assistant manager at Kynoch Press from 1928 to 1929. In 1931, he and Herbert Simon published Printing Explained.
