= The Gehenna Press =

Fine arts press (1942–2000)

- Founded: 1942
- Founder: Leonard Baskin
- Country of origin: United States
- Headquarters location: Northampton, MA
- Publication types: Limited edition books
- Nonfiction topics: Arts; literature; poetry; the humanities; philosophy; the natural sciences; classic literature

The Gehenna Press was one of the earliest limited edition fine arts presses in the United States. Established in 1942 by sculptor and graphic artist Leonard Baskin (1922–2000) while still a student at Yale, the award-winning press went on to publish approximately 200 books in nearly 80 years. The Press is known for its imaginative printing, use of type, binding and book illustration, as well as its collaborative work with several key 20th-century poets, including the United Kingdom's Poet Laureate Ted Hughes, Sylvia Plath and, posthumously, James Baldwin. Over the years, the Gehenna's work was widely exhibited in both museums and library collections, and its books are in public collections both in the U.S. and abroad. In 1995, Baskin and his work with the Press were recognized by the Library of Congress with a solo retrospective, the first for a living artist in its history. The press operated continuously until Baskin's death in 2000. The organization reopened in 2009 as a script-development and publishing service for film and web-series production.

== History ==
Gehenna's emphasis on poetry begins with its name. The word Gehenna refers both to the Hebrew word for "hell" and a line from Milton's epic poem Paradise Lost: "And black Gehenna call'd, the type of Hell." The wordplay goes even further, however, given how many "colloquial terms for printing made reference to devils, hell and 'the black art,'" as well as Baskin's artistic tendencies toward the macabre.

Inspired by William Blake's poetry and illustration, Gehenna's inaugural book likewise reflected Baskin's interest in the fine art of book-making — type and binding — as well as the woodblock prints and other images he used as illustrations. The high-quality craftmanship of the books were coupled with playfulness: type set in triangles, diamonds and other shapes, emphatic imagery, energetic lines, a key focal point sometimes highlighted with a splash of green or red, geometry that could get complicated despite a rough-hewn quality, and some of which was characteristic of the antique Chandler & Price treadle press that Baskin initially used to set type by hand.

Baskin's playfulness was eventually grounded by classic letterforms, particularly those designed and cut by Nicholas Jenson in Venice in the late fifteenth century, and revived in the early twentieth century. This "look" accompanied favorite subjects that included notable figures from the history of art and bookmaking, natural history, the Bible, and mythology, in addition to contemporary poetry and classic poetry and literature.

In keeping with Blake's model, the Press's inaugural book was a compendium of Baskin's own poems, and called On a Pyre of Withered Roses, a reflection of Baskin's interest in dark subject matter also evident in his visual art. Gehenna's second publication was a Little Book of Natural History, published in 1951, and likely inspired by his 1946 marriage to Esther Tane, a nature writer. That book was also several years in the making, interrupted first by Baskin's service in the U.S. Navy during WWII, and then by art school in Florence and Paris, respectively.

"Until 1953, books were printed in Worcester, Massachusetts and then, from 1956, the Press established an office in Northampton, Massachusetts at the Metcalf Printing Press. Between 1958 and 1976, Baskin employed Harold McGrath (d. 2000) as pressman, with the responsibility for typesetting and printing. From 1957, Sidney Kaplan, a friend of Baskin's, became, as Baskin put it in the 1992 half-century exhibition catalogue of the Press's works, 'the editor of the press.'"

"People like me, who care about printing," Baskin once said, "constitute the tiniest lunatic fringe in the nation." The introduction to the Archive of the Gehenna Press at the Bodleian Libraries at the University of Oxford neatly summarizes how Baskin's role at the Press changed over time, while also crediting the work of his colleagues and family:

The last book printed by Leonard Baskin himself was Blake and the Youthful Ancients (1956). Amongst other subsequent contributors, the letterpress printing was accomplished by Arthur (Art) Larson at Horton Tank Graphics, Daniel Kelleher at Wild Carrot Letterpress, Carol Blinn at Warwick Press and the Baskins' son Hosea Baskin, who printed Jewish Artists (1993) in Leeds. Arthur Larson also printed woodcuts, and Michael Kuch, etchings. The Oxbow Press (Roberta Bannister and Gail Alt), a photo-lithographic/offset printer, printed many of Gehenna's prospectuses and a few books as well, including The Gehenna Press: The Work of Fifty Years exhibition catalogue. Leonard Baskin continued to define the sensibility and typography and frequently the binding design of the books, as well as commissioning writers and illustrating the majority of the Press's works.

In 1992, Southern Methodist University's Bridwell Library and the Library of Congress mounted an exhibition to commemorate the Gehenna's half-century mark. Bibliographer and antiquarian bookseller Colin Franklin, along with Baskin and his son Hosea co-authored a bibliography of the Gehenna Press from 1942 to 1992, and Franklin also wrote a critical assessment. Oxbow Press published the book-length result: The Gehenna Press: The Work of Fifty Years, 1942–1992.

The Gehenna Press ceased operations with Baskin's death in 2000, ending nearly six decades of fine arts publishing.

== Creative process ==
The University of Wisconsin's Messenger magazine described Baskin's book-making creative process, prior to the traveling exhibition Poets at Gehenna: 1959–1995 that was scheduled to visit the UW-Madison libraries in January 1997:

Traditionally, artists provide images for existing poems. For the Gehenna Press, poets work from Baskin's original prints or drawings. The monumental Capriccio with poems by Ted Hughes, Sibyls by Ruth Fainlight, and the most recent book of the press, Presumptions of Death by Anthony Hecht, have all come from this atypical approach. Other featured books and broadsides include: Hugh MacDiarmid's Eemis Stane, Anthony Hecht's The Seven Deadly Sins, Ted Hughes's A Primer of Birds and Moko Maki, and James Baldwin's Gypsy. Working manuscripts, preliminary drawings, original woodblocks, and sequential proofs illuminate the creative process from the viewpoints of both artist and poet.

Baskin's most famous working relationship was with poet Ted Hughes. They first collaborated in producing the broadside, Pike: A Poem. Some fifteen years later, they renewed their Gehenna Press working relationship to produce A Primer of Birds (1981), a book of Hughes's poems illustrated by Baskin, and printed by the Gehenna Press in Lurley, a village in the English county of Devon. Other notable poets who collaborated with Baskin include Archibald MacLeish and Wilfred Owen.

In addition to his contemporary stable, Baskin also published, and usually illustrated, a wide variety of other poets and classic authors. The Gehenna's bibliography includes William Blake, Shakespeare, Aesop and Euripides, as well as Henry David Thoreau's Civil Disobedience, letters by James Agee, stories by Joseph Conrad and On the Nature of Inspiration (1962) by William Morris. The many art books published by the Gehenna ranged from books on artisans, printers, surveys of Dutch art, sculpture and Jewish artists, to a book on Rembrandt. The most eccentric books directly reflected some of Baskin's more macabre visual interests, such as Demons, Imps and Fiends (1976), and Fancies, Bizarries & Ornamented Grotesques (1989).

== Bibliography ==
- King, Dorothy (January 1, 1959). Notes on the Gehenna Press. Lunenburg, Vermont: PAGA The Stinehour Press. OCLC 978036037.
- Baskin, Leonard (1963). A Listing of Books to Be Had From the Gehenna Press. Massachusetts: Gehenna Press. OCLC 367390766.
- Baskin, Leonard (1964). A Catalogue of the Gehenna Press Works. Hartford: Gehenna Press. OCLC 4335862.
- Fern, Alan Maxwell (1969). A Note on the Gehenna Press. Massachusetts: Gehenna Press. OCLC 38618599.
- Brook, Steven (1976). A Bibliography of the Gehenna Press, 1942–1975. Northampton, MA: J. P. Dwyer. p. 79. OCLC 2987944.
- Franklin, Colin (1992). The Gehenna Press: The Work of Fifty Years, 1942–1992. Massachusetts: Bridwell/Gehenna. p. 239. ISBN 978-0-941881-09-8.

== Public collections ==
- Bowdoin Library
- Bodleian Archives and Manuscripts, Oxford University
- Fine Arts Museum of San Francisco
- The Five Colleges and Historic Deerfield Museum Consortium
- Library of Congress
- The National Gallery of Art
- The New York Public Library
- The Newark Public Library
- Portland Art Museum
- Firestone Library, Princeton University
- UW-Madison Library Collections

== Awards and honors ==
Baskin was the recipient of numerous awards and honors for his work, including six honorary doctorates, a Special Medal of Merit of the American Institute of Graphic Arts and a Printmaking Prize at the 1961 São Paulo Bienale. In 1994, the Library of Congress held a solo retrospective celebrating the Gehenna Press.
