= Memories and Vagaries =

1898 book by Axel Munthe

- 1930 US edition
- Author: Axel Munthe
- Language: English
- Genre: Essay collection
- Publisher: John Murray Publishing House
- Publication date: 1898
- Publication place: United States

Memories and Vagaries is a collection of short memoirs and essays by Axel Munthe published in several languages and editions, with differing contents and ordering.

A few of the pieces were published in various magazines, and favorable responses convinced Munthe to publish the collection. Known magazine publications include Toys (or Toys From the Paris Horizon) in Blackwood, and For Those Who Love Music in Murray's Magazine.

== First edition ==
It was first published under the title Vagaries in 1898 in London by the John Murray Publishing House. The first edition is now in the public domain.

The contents of the first edition are:

- Instead of a Preface
- Toys
- For Those Who Love Music
- Political Agitations in Capri
- Menagerie
- Italy in Paris
- Blackcock-Shooting
- To -
- Monsieur Alfredo
- Mont Blanc, King of the Mountains
- Raffaella
- The Dogs in Capri, An Interior
- Zoology
- Hypochondria
- La Madonna del Buon Camminone

== Second edition ==
A second edition was published in 1908, retitled Memories and Vagaries.

== Third edition ==
In 1930, a third edition was published, with a new preface and somewhat different contents, and the titles of several pieces altered. Its contents are:

- Preface
- For Those Who Love Music
- Toys From the Paris Horizon (called "Toys" in the first edition)
- Monsieur Alfredo
- Italy in Paris
- Raffaella
- Mont Blanc, King of the Mountains
- Menagerie
- Zoology
- A Cry in the Wilderness
- Political Agitations in Capri
- The Dogs in Capri
- Soeur Philomène
- When Tappio Was Lost
- La Madonna del Buon Cammino
- Porta San Paolo
- Instead of a Preface

It was reprinted at least ten more times between 1930 and 1947.

== Small press ==
In 1916, Horace Carr of Cleveland published an edition of 200 copies of To - on French handmade paper.

In 1925, a limited edition of 221 copies of Vagaries by Munthe were published for Violet and Hal W. Trovillion at the Herrin News Shop in Herrin, Illinois.. This contained Rafaella, Toys From the Paris Horizon, and For Those Who Love Music.

== Translations ==
Memories and Vagaries seems to have very different titles in other languages, often being titled roughly An Old Book of Man and Beasts.

- En gammal bok om människor och djur, Stockholm, 1931
- Ein altes Buch von Menschen und Tieren, Leipzig, 1934
- Hommes et Betes, Paris, 1937
- Homens e Bichos, Portuguese translation by António Sérgio, 1937
- Oud boek van menschen en dieren
- Hombres y bestias, Spanish translation by Pierre dy Resckuin
- Vagabondaggio, Milan, 1933, is quite possibly also a translation of this work.

== Summaries ==
- Instead of a Preface discusses the author's reasons for publication.
- Preface (1930) discusses the reasons for the revised edition, and notes the inclusion of several pieces that are also incorporated into The Story of San Michele
- For Those Who Love Music concerns an impoverished organ grinder and his monkey.
- Toys From the Paris Horizon is a whimsical comparison of dolls from various nations, particularly in terms of the competition between the German and French toy industries.
- Blackcock-shooting is an exhortation against cruel animal trapping practices and unnecessary hunting and slaughter of animals, combined with a memoir of a hunting expedition.
- Monsieur Alfredo depicts a down-at-the-heels playwright and drama teacher.
- Italy in Paris is an account of an impoverished Italian family with a sick child living in Paris.
- Rafaella tells the story of a young Italian artist's model in Paris.
- Mont Blanc, King of the Mountains is an account of a mountain climbing expedition, with the mountains and weather being highly personified.
- Menagerie describes an exhibition of animals.
- A Cry in the Wilderness is a brief essay on animal rights and human cultural evolution.
- Political Agitations in Capri is an anecdote concerning German tourists on Capri.
- The Dogs of Capri talks of the politics of the dogs on Capri, particularly as related to the social divisions of their owners.
- Souer Philomène describes a religious sister serving as a nurse in a Paris hospital while Munthe was a medical student there.
- When Tappio Was Lost is an account of some events involving Munthe that took place during the cholera epidemic in Naples in 1884.
- La Madonna de Buon Cammino is another account from the Naples cholera epidemic of 1884, concerning a priest and his shrine.
- Porta San Paolo describes the Protestant Cemetery in Rome and includes meditations on death.
- To - describes the friendship and uncomplaining nature of the author's dog, and is something of a commentary on human morals.
