= Clara Chipman Newton =

American artist

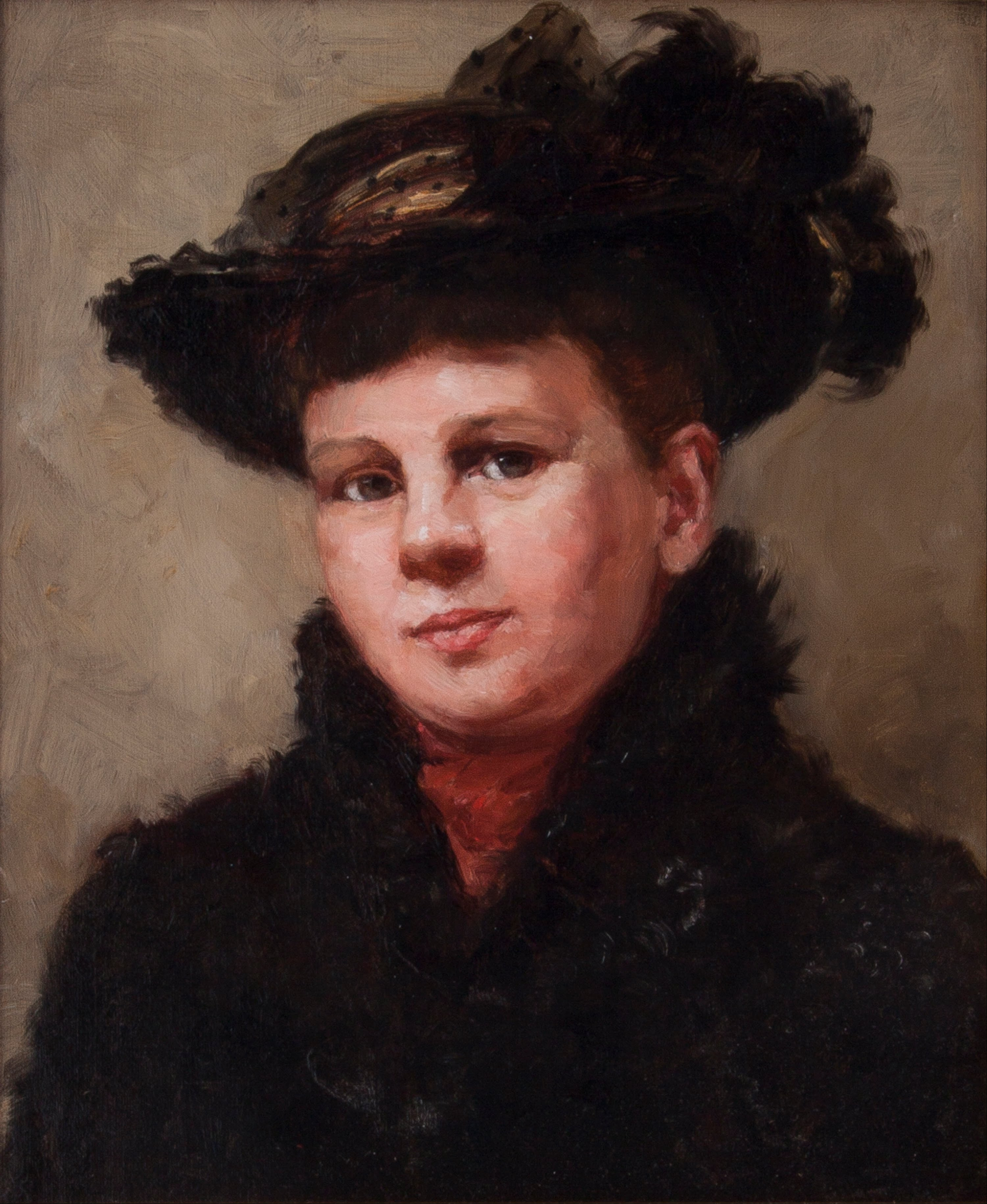
- Clara Chipman Newton as painted by Mary Louise McLaughlin
- Born: October 26, 1848; Delphos, Ohio, U.S.
- Died: December 8, 1936 (aged 88); Cincinnati, Ohio, U.S.
- Resting place: Spring Grove Cemetery
- Known for: Painting

Clara Chipman Newton (October 26, 1848 – December 8, 1936) was an American artist best known as a painter of porcelain and china.

== Education and early life ==
Born in Delphos, Ohio, Newton was the daughter of S.C. Newton, a Vermont merchant who moved his family to Cincinnati in 1852. She attended Miss Appleton's Private School for Girls from 1863-65. When her father died in 1871 and her stepmother moved to Denver, Colorado, Newton chose to stay in Ohio.

In the early 1870s, she attended the School of Design of the University of Cincinnati, where she studied wood-carving and china painting with Benn Pitman. In addition to her artistic abilities, Newton was noted among friends and colleagues for her exceptional memory, business acumen, vivid turns of phrase, and distinctive handwriting.

== Art career ==
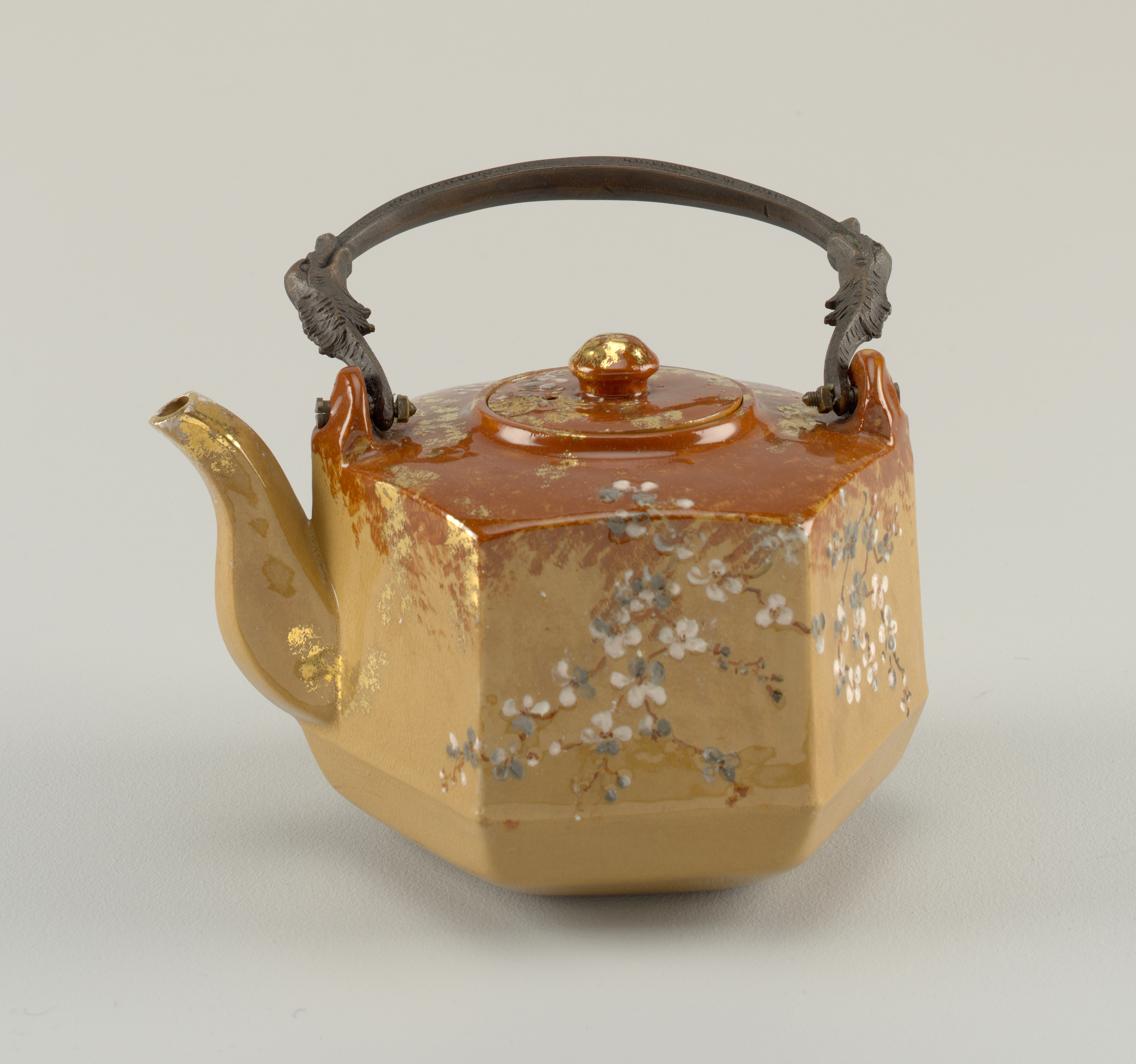
Earthenware teapot with bronze handle, inscribed "Made by Clara Chipman Newton for Maria Longworth Nichols with deepest appreciation and affection Dec. 25, 1882." Cooper Hewitt, Smithsonian Design Museum

Newton exhibited her china painting at the 1876 Philadelphia Centennial Exposition, and in 1879 she became one of the founding members and the secretary of the Cincinnati Pottery Club along with Mary Louise McLaughlin, who was to become a close friend. For more than a decade, beginning with its founding in 1880, she worked at Maria Longworth Nichols Storer's Rookwood Pottery, as a china decorator, archivist, and general assistant with the title of secretary. She shared with Storer responsibility for overseeing the decoration and glazing, and beginning in 1881 she taught classes in overglaze painting at Rookwood's new pottery school. Newton was thus deeply involved with two of the institutions—the Cincinnati Pottery Club and Rookwood—that are most closely associated with the American art pottery movement of the late 19th century

For the 1893 World's Columbian Exposition in Chicago, Newton played an important role in helping to organize the Cincinnati Room in the Woman's Building. Newton was put in charge of arranging all of the exhibits in the Cincinnati Room, some 280 objects altogether—a quarter of them made by Newton's friend and mentor McLaughlin— ranging from ceramics, paintings, sculpture, and woodcarving to needlework and books.

Newton did not have independent means, so to supplement her work at Rookwood she opened her own studio in downtown Cincinnati in 1885 and around the same time took a part-time job as a teacher at the Thane Miller School. By the early 1900s, Newton had moved to Glendale, where she was head of the art department for the Glendale Female Seminary. Over the course of her career, she taught china painting, watercolor, oil painting, and relief modeling.

Throughout her life, she was a champion of new media and what she called "women's work", pursuing her activism through a variety of arts-and-crafts organizations. Among other things, she was a founding member and secretary of the Cincinnati Woman's Club (in continuous operation since 1894).

In 1906, Newton provided a group of watercolor decorations for an edition of Oscar Wilde's Poems in Prose that was published in Thomas Bird Mosher's "Ideal Series of Little Masterpieces" (Vol. 2 of 12). These include illuminated capital letters and graceful, full-page arabesques in the Art Nouveau style. At the time, such embellishments were not uncommon in editions intended for collectors.

An example of her porcelain painting work is in the Metropolitan Museum of Art's (NYC) permanent collection, on display in the American Wing, Gallery 774.

Newton's personal papers were donated to the Cincinnati Historical Society after her death on December 8, 1936, at age 88.
