= Murray's Magazine =

Murray's Magazine was a monthly magazine published by the John Murray publishing house. Sixty issues were published, from January 1887 through to December 1891. It was priced at 1/- (one shilling).

The magazine included limited amounts of fiction, including works by

- Thomas Hardy
- Vernon Lee (as "Amour Dure") in January 1887
- Emily Lawless
- Lucas Malet
- Axel Munthe ("For Those Who Love Music", later collected in Memories and Vagaries)
- Margaret Louisa Woods

Non-fictional works include:

- Richard Corney Grain's autobiography
- articles on music by composer Mary Augusta Wakefield
