= John Fass =

American graphic designer and printer

John Fass in his one-room apartment at the Bronx YMCA. He also used this room as a printing and photography studio.

John Stroble Fass (August 25, 1890 - July 19, 1973) was an American graphic designer and a printer of fine press books. Fass designed books for the leading American publishers of limited edition books. Collectors of private press books also remember John Fass for the handcrafted books he printed on a tabletop printing press in his one-room apartment at the Bronx YMCA. Fass' books and his photography celebrate his life in New York City, where he lived most of his career. His work also documents his passion for the rural landscapes of his native Lancaster County, Pennsylvania.

== Early life ==
John S. Fass was born in Lititz, Pennsylvania, a borough located in Lancaster County. His father, David C. Fass, was a cigar maker and a laborer. John's mother, Sara C. Fass, supplemented the family income as a dressmaker. The family had deep roots in rural Lancaster County; Fass' family included Moravian and Mennonite ancestry.

Although Fass' career kept him in New York City for more than 40 years, he frequently returned to his quiet hometown of Lititz. Fass never married, and maintained close ties with his relatives in Lancaster County, where he returned in old age to live with his sister Esther Wert in Lititz.

Fass began his career in the printing trade as a 12-year-old, working summers as an errand boy for a Lititz newspaper's print shop. After graduating from high school, he continued his work at the Lititz print shop, working as a typesetter.

After serving in the U. S. Army, Fass moved to Philadelphia in 1918 to work as a compositor for the Holmes Press. Two years later Fass moved to New York City to work as a compositor for David Gildea & Company which specialized in advertising design and typography.

From 1923 to 1925 Fass worked for the printing and publishing house of William Edwin Rudge at Mount Vernon, New York. The town is located in West Chester County, on the border of the Bronx. While employed by William Rudge, John worked alongside Bruce Rogers, who was "the greatest modern book designer" according to a 1939 Time magazine article. Rogers' modernist-yet-classical design sensibility greatly influenced Fass' own sense of style. Fass' style became characterized by clean, precisionist design accented with finely crafted ornament.

A page from John Fass' 1958 book The Alphabet in Various Arrangements. printed on his tabletop press at the Bronx YMCA, with his Hammer Creek Press imprint. Photograph by John Fass. Private Collection.

== Harbor Press ==
In 1925 Fass left the Rudge shop to create his own printing house with a Rudge co-worker, Roland Wood and wife Elizabeth Wood. That same year they founded the Harbor Press in a small shop in midtown Manhattan. The press specialized in creating fine-edition books, with Fass focusing on the design, and Roland Wood usually doing the printing.

The Harbor Press quickly established a reputation for producing beautifully crafted books. Fass and Wood produced limited editions of works by leading American writers such as Robert Frost and William Faulkner, signed by the writers.

George Macy, the publisher of the Limited Editions Club, soon noticed Fass' talents. From 1925 into the 1940s, John designed most of the books published by Macy. In addition, the Harbor Press designed and printed works for New York's most influential bibliophiles: the members of the Grolier Club and members of the Typophiles.

Books printed at Fass' Harbor Press include:

- Extracts from the Diary of Roger Payne (1928) For the American Institute of Graphic Arts.
- A Way Out: A One Act Play (1929) By Robert Frost.
- Undine (1930) By F. De La Motte Fouqué for the Limited Editions Club.
- The Epping Hunt (1930) By Thomas Hood for the Derrydale Press.
- Idyll in the Desert (1931) By William Faulkner for Random House.
- A Bibliography of the Works of Ernest Hemingway (1931) By Louis Henry Cohn.
- The Golden Ass (1932) By Apuleius for the Limited Editions Club.
- The Angler (1933) By Washington Irving.
- Hunting Sketches (1933) By Anthony Trollope.
- The Study of Incunabula (1933) For the Grolier Club.
- Typee by Herman Melville (1935) For the Limited Editions Club.
- The Ballad of Reading Gaol (1937) By Oscar Wilde for the Limited Editions Club.

Dr Hellmut Lehmann-Haupt in his Book in America explained that John Fass and his Harbor Press created books with "...a flavor of good breeding and tradition...which is pleasantly mixed with a sense of humor and intimacy."

John Fass and Roland Wood closed the Harbor Press in 1939. Wood pursued a career in acting, while John Fass continued his career as a book designer for leading American publishers, and a graphic designer for New York advertising companies, where he specialized in designing advertising typography. He was a typographer for Young and Rubicam, one of Manhattan's largest advertising companies. Fass continued working in New York advertising and publishing for the rest of his career.

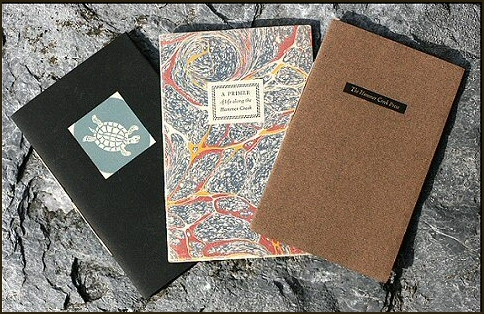
Books created by John Fass in the 1950s in his apartment at the Bronx YMCA. Private Collection.

== Printing at the Bronx YMCA ==
For many years John Fass lived in a single-room apartment at the Bronx YMCA. In this room Fass created his most iconic works: small editions printed on small handpresses. Fass was as clean and precise with his YMCA room decor as he was with his book design. Herman Cohen, owner of the Chiswick Book Shop, collected Fass' work and wrote Fass' bibliography. Cohen described Fass' room as the most immaculate room he had ever seen, despite the room being filled with printing and photography equipment. (Fass stored his cases of printing press type under his bed.)

=== Hell-Box Press ===
Fass created his first YMCA printing projects using the imprint name Hell-Box Press, named for a print shop hellbox, in which printers threw used metal type for recasting. Fass' hobby was woodworking, so he created miniature wooden printing presses for his Hell-Box printing endeavors. Throughout the 1920s and 1930 Fass used his miniature, 14-inch-high presses to create booklets, bookplates, Christmas cards, and ephemera. He inked the letters with his fingertip.

Some of Fass' Hellbox imprints were custom bound in fine leather by another YMCA resident, John Archer, who was supervisor of the print shop and book bindery at the New York Public Library.

=== Hammer Creek Press ===
In the 1950s and early 1960s, while working for Manhattan advertising agencies, John Fass created immaculate masterworks of letterpress printing in his cramped room at the Bronx YMCA. He named his press The Hammer Creek Press, named for the Hammer Creek which flows near his boyhood home in Lititz, Pennsylvania.

Fass printed books, leaflets, broadsides, bookplates and other small works of letterpress art. He created these works for his own pleasure, and as gifts for his friends. He printed these projects with a tabletop Albion press, made in 1905. Fass received the press from his close friend the illustrator Valenti Angelo, who had received the press from Fass' former coworker Bruce Rogers.

Fass' printer's device for the Hammer Creek Press was the turtle, which became his symbol of slowly crafted art, and excellence of design. Fass' friend John DePol illustrated various works of this press with wood engravings.

In 1959 and 1960 Fass also printed collections of leaf prints, printing directly from the leaves onto Japanese tissue. "Fass was essentially a private printer, working alone at his own pace. What he did was done for his own pleasure. But his work, small in size and issued in minuscule editions, was exquisite and executed with impeccable taste. He was a genius at the arrangement of type, ornaments, and wood engravings. Every piece he produced was a small gem, for Fass had the time, skill, and materials to print everything by hand patiently and perfectly," according to collector Aveve Cohen. Despite Fass' modesty about his YMCA printing projects, his friends were determined to showcase Fass' exceptional printing work to the rest of New York. Friends of John Fass created several exhibits in New York during this era. John Archer organized an exhibition of Hell-Box Press and Hammer Creek Press imprints in 1953 for the New York Public Library. In 1962 Herman Cohen helped create an exhibition of Fass' work at New York's Grolier Club, the oldest American society of bibliophiles and book collectors. This was followed by an exhibition at the Cooper Union.

== Life after the Bronx YMCA ==
In 1962 John Fass moved from his room in the Bronx YMCA to the Hotel Pierrepont in Brooklyn. He sold his tabletop printing press back to Valenti Angelo. As Fass' health deteriorated he decided to return to his hometown of Lititz, Pennsylvania, where he lived with his sister Esther Wert. He died in 1973, and is buried in the Lititz Moravian Cemetery.

The leading institutions which have collected Fass' books and other printed works include: The New York Public Library, The Rochester Institute of Technology, Amherst College, Columbia University (via the Albert Ulmann Fund), University of California, University of Texas, University of Kansas, etc.

Photograph by John S. Fass. New York City in the early 1940s. Many of Fass' 1940s New York photographs reflect the themes of the Precisonist Movement. Private Collection.

== Fass' Precisionist Photography ==
John Fass was an avid photographer throughout his lifetime. His photographs were not commercially published or exhibited, but were for his own pleasure. His earliest-known photographs are dated 1914, and document Fass' early life in his hometown of Lititz, Pennsylvania.

Throughout the 1940s to the 1960s Fass created precisionisist photographic images of New York City and Lancaster County, Pennsylvania. He created works that were as finely crafted and immaculately composed as his printing.

Much of Fass' modernist New York photography of the 1940s and 1950s reveals Fass' contributions to the artistic movement known as Precisionism. This art movement was pioneered by Pennsylvania artists Charles Demuth and Charles Sheeler, who were Fass' contemporaries. Demuth and Fass were both from Lancaster County, Pennsylvania, where Fass was born seven years after Demuth's birth.

Fass presented a collection of his photography to the New York Public Library, where today some of his photographs are exhibited online in the library's digital collection. Most of Fass' photography remains in private collections.
