= M. Bernard Loates =

Canadian artist (born 1945)

- Born: Murphy Bernard Loates; January 1, 1945 (age 81); Toronto, Ontario, Canada
- Occupations: Artist, lithographer, photographer, publisher
- Years active: 1964–present
- Spouses: Lynda Veitch (m. 1969; died 1989) Karen Somerville (m. 2000)
- Website: A Private Press.com

M. Bernard Loates (born January 1, 1945) is a Canadian artist, lithographer and publisher in the manner of the private press movement. The private press movement refers to a printing press or publishing method that is artistic based, with great attention to detail as opposed to commercially based. The proprietor controls all elements of the publication, from concept, to design, to the final execution. "Loates is recognized as one of the finest printing artisans..." Loates is best known in the United States for his M. Bernard Loates Edition of John James Audubon, Birds of America. In Canada, Loates is best known for his work with A.J. Casson, the last living member of the Group of Seven.

== Early life ==
Loates was born in Toronto, a fraternal twin and the youngest of four boys. The family home was in Newtonbrook, a northern Toronto neighbourhood bordered by woods. Loates and his twin brother met Frederick Henry Brigden, founder of the Canadian Watercolourist Society, at his studio there. Brigden introduced Loates and his brother to the art of watercolours. At that young age they began painting as they explored the wooded area by Brigden's studio.

Loates left school at the age of 14. He held several jobs before being employed by Atomic Energy of Canada, beginning as a file clerk and becoming the lead draughtsman by age 19. It was here that Loates’ illustrated his first book beginning a long-lasting relationship with Publisher/Distributor Holt, Rinehart and Winston, as well as Prentice Hall. Loates left Atomic Energy of Canada to become a publisher full-time.

== Publishing career ==
Loates started Nature Impressions in 1968 and published three limited edition prints for his brother, nature artist M. Glen Loates. It wasn't until 1975 that Bernard Loates published his first book under the name Cerebrus Press, Mammals in Profile, artist: Glen Loates. A follow-up volume was published in 1979.

In 1977, Bernard published his first fine art book, The Art of Glen Loates. This was published as both an open edition or "trade" edition, as well as a limited edition with an enhanced format under the name Cerebrus Publishing. During this project Bernard worked with author, Paul Duval. This limited edition book was the first book that was published in the private press manner beginning in 1975 and was launched at the McMichael Conservation Collection of Art in Kleinberg, accompanied by a show of the artist's work.

The founder Robert McMichael introduced Bernard to the Group of Seven art that would become his focus in publishing, as demonstrated in the books that were later published. Bernard and author Paul Duval worked on the next fine art book, The Tangled Garden: the Art of J.E.H. MacDonald, published in 1978. J. E. H. MacDonald was the first member of the Group of Seven that Bernard published.

In 1979 A.J. Casson was the last surviving member of the Group of Seven. Bernard began a working relationship with Casson that would endure until his death in 1992. The first publication featuring Casson was Elora and Salem; Twenty Sketches released for a retail price of cdn$18,000. This was Bernard's second publishing in the private press manner.

Bernard continued publishing programs with Glen Loates, A.J. Casson, Toni Onley, and Walter J. Phillips amongst others. The publishing programs were in three forms, single print limited editions, trade edition books and limited edition books.

Bernard's work brought him to the attention of Pierre Trudeau, and Bernard became a frequent guest to the Prime Minister's residence and various balls where he was introduced to George H. W. Bush and Jean Chrétien, amongst others.

In 1982, through the Prime Minister's Office, a gift was made to the people of the United States by the people of Canada. Bernard Loates, the artist Glen Loates and Allan Gotlieb, Canadian Ambassador to the United States, presented to Ronald Reagan a painting of a bald eagle to commemorate the Year of the Eagle. The presentation was held in the Oval Office at the White House.

In 1983 Loates opened his print studio to other artists, publishing under the artist's own name/studio rather than his own branding. These included both limited edition books and prints, printed in much the same private press manner that Loates had developed. This also included some limited edition print publishing houses at the time, including Greenwich Workshop. By the end of 1986 Loates was forced to reduce his outside work when he began the Audubon project.

In 1987 Loates began the Audubon project. Exclusive to this project Loates designed a custom-made paper that he had produced by Manadnock Paper Mills, New Hampshire. It was watermarked "Bernard Loates Stallion Vellum". Produced with continuous tone with no typical lithographic processes, as if "painted with a printing press". The three M. Bernard Loates Audubon editions, Introduction, Tribute I and Tribute II earned Loates the recognition of Artist of the Year at the Wildlife Exposition in 1989. Loates was also honoured by the City of Mobile, Alabama when Mayor Arthur R. Outlaw presented a key to the city and declared September 21, 1988 as M. Bernard Loates day for "the Loates' process" "has created the finest ever produced by Audubon". During this time Bernard toured the Southern United States as a guest speaker at selected universities.

In 1989 Loates developed a unique lithographic process of screenless "tone" printing, known as the Bertone™ process. This new process was used in such projects as A.J. Casson's Ontario and Casson's Casson, Volume I and II.

In 1991 Loates began the octave edition of John James Audubon, Birds of America.

In 1996 once again Loates opened his print studio to other artists, printing limited editions until early in 2000. Some of the artists published were Tony Bianco, Claudio D'Angelo, Michael Dumas, Robert Genn, Dwayne Harty, George McLean, Alan Wylie, Thomas Quinn and Rudi Stussi.

In 1999 Loates entered an agreement with Aboriginal Canadian artist Norval Morrisseau also known as Copper Thunderbird, and the "Picasso of the North", to produce a folio of serigraphics based upon thirty of his original works of art. Due to health issues of Morrisseau, this edition was "signed in the plate" using the Cree syllabics for Copper Thunderbird.

In 2010, Loates introduced the White Volume Series™ highlighting upcoming Editions of the Group of Seven and their Contemporaries. The first release featured Lawren Harris and previewed at the 11th Toronto International Art Fair during October 28 to November 21, 2010. The title is "Lawren Harris: Where the Universe Sings." The full release is in 2011.

== Art and photography career ==
Loates’ original oil entitled ‘Early Spring Eastern Bluebird’, painted expressly for the Wildlife Exposition and commissioned by the New York Audubon Society was also offered as a signed and numbered limited edition print. A portion of the sale of the prints went to benefit wildlife and environmental programs supported by the Society.

Loates has continued his painting career to this day, his work hangs in private collections both throughout North America and internationally.

== Personal life ==
While married to Lynda Veitch, Loates built his dream home which housed his family and growing business, including a lithographic press. They remained married until her death on November 18, 1988.

On October 2, 2000, Loates remarried to Karen Somerville. They remain married to this day.

== Publications ==
All publications are on deposit with the National Library of Canada.

Open Editions are typically released through traditional book sellers. The size of this release is usually greater than 5,000 books and may be reprinted. Limited Edition books are released in far fewer numbers with enhanced features, and typically is not reprinted. The Limited Edition is sought by collectors as the more desirable edition.

Year	Format	Artist	Images/Author	Editions
1968	Limited Edition Prints	Glen Loates	Cardinal, Ruffed Grouse & Cougar	Limited only
1975	Mammals in Profile I & II (1979)	Glen Loates	Randolph Peterson	Open only
1977	The Art of Glen Loates	Glen Loates	Paul Duval	Limited and Open
1978	Norbert Nipkin	Steve Pilcher	Robert McConnell	Open only
1978	The Tangled Garden	J.E.H. MacDonald	Paul Duval	Open only
1979	Elora and Salem; Twenty Sketches	A.J. Casson	A.J. Casson	Limited only
1979	Birds of North America	Glen Loates	Ross D. James	Open only
1980	Serigraphs	A.J. Casson	A.J. Casson	Limited only
1980	A.J. Casson; A Tribute	A.J. Casson	Paul Duval	Limited and Open
1980	A Coming of Winter	Glen Loates	Ross D. James	Limited only
1981	Walter J. Phillips; Complete Graphic Works	Walter J. Phillips	Roger Boulet	Limited only
1981	A Northern Suite I & II	A.J. Casson	A.J. Casson	Limited only
1981	The Tranquility and the Turbulence	Walter J. Phillips	Roger Boulet	Open only
1981	A Silent Thunder	Toni Onley	Roger Boulet	Open only
1982	My Favourite Watercolours	A.J. Casson	Paul Duval	Limited and Open (1980)
1982	The Canadian Earth	Group of Seven & Tom Thomson	Roger Boulet	Open only
1984	A Brush with Life	Glen Loates	Glen Warner	Open only
1987	Audubon; Introduction	John James Audubon	M.Bernard Loates	Limited only
1988	Audubon; Tribute I	John James Audubon	M.Bernard Loates	Limited only
1989	Ontario Series; 6 Folios of 5 Original Lithos	A.J. Casson	A.J. Casson	Limited only
1989	Casson's Casson I & II	A.J. Casson	A.J. Casson	Limited only
1989	Audubon, Tribute II	John James Audubon	M.Bernard Loates	Limited only
1990	Platinum Edition, Folio I & II	A.J. Casson	A.J. Casson	Limited only
1990	Regal Canvas Collection™, Omega Series	A.J. Casson	A.J. Casson	Limited only
1991	Shapes and Contrasts Folio	A.J. Casson	A.J. Casson	Limited only
1999	Norval Morrisseau, Copper Thunderbird	Norval Morrisseau	M.Bernard Loates	Limited only
2010	Lawren Harris; Where the Universe Sings	Lawren Harris	Paul Duval	Limited and Open
