= Trovillion Press =

Violet De Mars Trovillion (1890–1979) and Hal W. Trovillion (1879–1967) were publishers based in Herrin, Illinois who operated local newspapers and a private press known as Trovillion Private Press at the Sign of the Silver Horse or simply Trovillion Press.

== History ==
In 1904, after Hal left Indiana University, he moved to Herrin and took over two local newspapers, The Herrin Daily Journal and the Egyptian Republican (previously named The Herrin News).

In 1908, influenced by Thomas Bird Mosher, he started private press publication. Mosher's work was notable for small size, attractive design, high-quality paper and affordable prices, and Trovillion emulated these practices. Works were typically published in editions of a few hundred copies, on fine handmade European papers, with titles printed in gilt or on paper title cards. Usually every copy was numbered, and hand-signed by both of the Trovillions.

The books were almost all short, under 100 pages and often under 50 pages. Some of the pieces published were by lesser-known works by well-known authors, and sometimes were short pieces typically published as part of larger work. Some of the books were reprints of historical works, generally from the 17th century. A number of books concerning gardening were published, including a reprint of a gardening book from 1617. Some of the works published were by the Trovillions, and some concerned running private presses. The University of Missouri Library System reports that fifty books were published from 1908 through 1958 , and also reports that operations ceased in 1958, though at least one work bears a copyright date of 1960. They also note that the Trovillions sometimes used "Thatchcot", the name of their home, as an imprint.

== Publications ==
Publications include:

- Vagaries by Munthe, by Axel Munthe, 1925, 43p, edition of 221 copies. Contains three stories (Rafaella, Toys from the Paris Horizon, and For Those Who Love Music) from Memories and Vagaries.
- the Love Letters of Henry VIII, 1936, 26p, ASIN B000874CHW. 1945 edition ASIN B0007DUNQQ.
- Llewelyn Powys's A Baker's Dozen, published in 1939, shortly after the author's death
- A bibliography of Trovillion Private Press operated by Violet & Hal W. Trovillion at the Sign of the Silver Horse, by J. Herman Schauinger, 1943, 49p, edition of 277 copies, written for undergraduate credit towards a library science degree
- Visitation at Thatchcot: A Symposium of Little Journeys to the Home of Trovillion Private Press, by Harry R. Burke and F. A. Behymer, 1944.
- The merchant royall, being a sermon preached in 1607 in praise of the wife, wherein she is likened to a merchant ship. Whereunto is added an introd. by Stanley Pargellis, Robert Wilkinson (flourished around 1607), 1945, edition of 477 copies
- The Selfish Giant, Oscar Wilde, 1945. Taken from his collection The Happy Prince and Other Stories
- Books and Gardens By Alexander Smith, 1946. 807 copies, all signed and numbered. Set in 11-point Baskerville by Leroy Lintner.
- The countrie housewife's garden by William Lawson, edition of 1066 copies. Reprint of a book from 1617.
- I Salute the Silver Horse, Being the Story of Trovillion Private Press, America's Oldest Private Press, Whereunto is Added an Account of Its Founding By Hal W. Trovillion, by Paul Jordan-Smith, 1958, 16pp. Note that Trovillion was not the first private press in America, though in 1958 it may have been the oldest currently-active private press.
- Sharing by Note Book, by Hal W. Trovillion, 1960, first edition of 497 copies
- "Delights for Ladies", Copyright 1939. A limited edition of 498 copies was published in the summer of 1942. This book of 120 pages is a reprint of the 1609 edition of Sir Hugh Plat's original collection of various 17th century cooking, preserving and distilling recipes. A glossary and table were added.
- "In Casa Mia; A collection of House and Home Sentiments in Prose and Verse" selected by Violet De Mars Trovillion and Hal W. Trovillion, pub. 1960, 64 pages, 670 copies.

== Correspondence ==
The Trovillians had extensive literary connections in the US and Europe, corresponding regularly with authors and publishers. Their friends and correspondents included:

- type designer Frederic Goudy
- Dan Byrne Jones
- Daphne du Maurier
- artist Roscoe Misselhorn, known as "The Norman Rockwell of the Midwest"
- artist Mathias Noheimer
- John Cowper Powys, whom they visited at Corwen in 1938
- Lloyd Emerson Siberell, a railroad official who was an avid bibliographer with a special interest in the Powys brothers.
- G. M. Trevelyan
- artist Margaret Ely Webb

Some of the Trovillian's correspondence with John Powys has been published in "Powys to the Trovillions: The Letters of John Cowper Powys to Hal and Violet Trovillion", edited by Paul Roberts, 122pp, ISBN 0-900821-95-7.

The Trovillion press archives are at the Morris Library, Southern Illinois University at Carbondale.

== Sundial ==
In the early 1930s, the Trovillions purchased an elaborate hand-hammered copper armillary-style sundial in Stockholm, Sweden and installed it in their back yard in Herrin. In July 2005, the sundial was stolen from the yard (both owned by John Fisher). Fisher offered a $1000 reward for its return. The theft was decidedly odd due to the significant weight of the sundial and the difficulty of removing it from its concrete base.

== See also ==
- Amateur Press Association

The house, named Thatchcot, in which the Trovillion Press was located, suffered a fire December 7, 2001. Many of the original printings from the press were destroyed. The owner, John Fisher, has still not reached a settlement to restore the historic home.
