= Atwater-Linton House =

Historic house in Connecticut, United States

- U.S. National Register of Historic Places
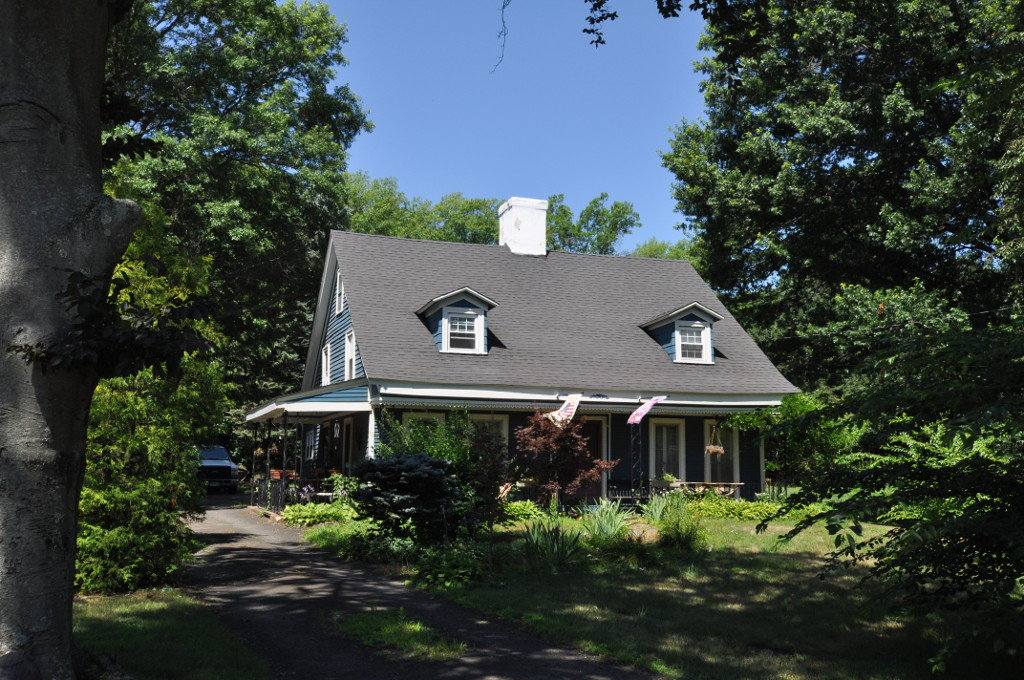

- Location within Connecticut Location within the United States
- Location: 1804 State Street, Hamden, Connecticut
- Coordinates: 41°19′53″N 72°54′1″W
- Area: 0.6 acres (0.24 ha)
- Architectural style: Colonial, Gothic, Postmedieval Eng.;Cape Style
- NRHP reference No.: 91001923
- Added to NRHP: January 17, 1992

The Atwater-Linton House, also known historically as Appledore, is a historic house at 1804 State Street U.S. Route 5 in Hamden, Connecticut. Built about 1781 by a descendant of one of the area's first settlers, it was the home of wood-engraver and political activist William James Linton in the late 19th century. It was listed on the National Register of Historic Places in 1992.

== Description and history ==
The Atwater-Linton House is located in southeastern Hamden, on the West Side of State Street (U.S. Route 5), between Hyde and Benton Streets. Set farther back from the street than surrounding later construction, it is a 1 1/2-story Cape style wood-frame structure, with a side gable roof, central chimney, and clapboarded exterior. Two gabled dormers project from the front roof face, which extends beyond the facade to provide a porch space supported by modern iron supports. A hip-roof porch extends across part of the south-facing left side. Victorian trim has been applied to portions of the exterior. The interior of the house largely reflects a c. 1880 restyling.

The Atwater family were longtime owners of land in this area, with early settler David Atwater owning hundreds of acres in the 17th century. Jared Atwater, his descendant, had this house built not long after acquiring some of that land in 1781. It is believed to be the oldest standing house in the area associated with this family. It was leased in 1870 by Linton, a British wood-engraver and political activist, who named it "Appledore" after the apple orchard on the hill above. Linton was responsible for the Victorian alterations to the house. He lived here for thirty years, creating many wood-engravings, and engaging in correspondence with a wide array of literary and social figures.

== See also ==
- National Register of Historic Places listings in New Haven County, Connecticut
