= Holloway Press =

Holloway Press was established at the University of Auckland in the Library of the Tamaki Campus in 1994. Poet Alan Loney was responsible for printings until 1998, and books are now almost wholly designed, printed and bound by Tara McLeod under the direction of Dr. Peter Simpson.

The Holloway Press has received assistance from the University Development Fund for its activity within the Faculty of Arts.
