= Thornwillow Press =

- Founded: 1985
- Founder: Luke Ives Pontifell
- Country of origin: United States
- Headquarters location: Newburgh, New York
- Official website: www.thornwillow.com

Thornwillow Press is a private press in the United States. Since its founding in 1985, Thornwillow has published original work of John Updike, Arthur Schlesinger, JP Donleavy, Edmund Morris, Warren Berger, Louis Auchincloss, James Merrill, Hugh Sidey, David Mamet, and Walter Cronkite, among others. All Thornwillow books are published in limited editions and are printed letterpress and hand-bound. They are included in the permanent collections of The White House, The Morgan Library, The Beinecke at Yale, The Houghton at Harvard, among others. Presidents George W. Bush and Bill Clinton gave Thornwillow books as state gifts.

== Background ==
Luke Pontifell, age sixteen, started Thornwillow Press in rented workspace in New York. Thornwillow's first publication was Hello Sun, a short children's story by Barbara England. Pontifell sent a copy to William Shirer, the historian and journalist, who in return sent a manuscript of his reflections of the end of World War II, which he had not yet published. This became An August to Remember, Thornwillow's second publication, in an edition of three hundred, offered in both cloth and leather bindings. Since, most Thornwillow editions have been offered in several different bindings, ranging in cost.

Pontifell sent copies of An August to Remember to several writers which he admired, requesting manuscripts for publication. He received enthusiastic response from Walter Cronkite, which resulted in the publication of Remembering the Moon; Arthur Schlesinger, which resulted in the publication of JFK Remembered; and Helmut Kohl, which resulted in the publication of Partnership in Liberty.'

== Current ==
Today, Thornwillow is based in Newburgh, New York. Recent work includes series of books on the presidents, with titles by Edmund Morris, Harold Holzer, Willian vanden Heuvel, Wendell Garrett, and W. W. Abbot, as well as expanded to re-issues of classic works in limited editions. In 2017, Thornwillow published The Sonnets of William Shakespeare, with an introduction by Harvard President Neil Rudenstine, and Sherlock Holmes Hexalogy, the favorite stories of Sir Arthur Conan Doyle. Both editions were funded through Kickstarter, raising $53,384 and $92,322 respectively. In 2020, Thornwillow published Edgar Allan Poe: Tales, Mysteries, and Contrivances, with illustrations by John Reardon and an introduction by Jill Lepore, which raised $150,915 on Kickstarter.
