= Mary Louise McLaughlin =

American artist

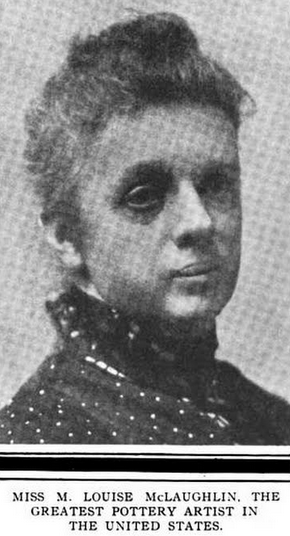
- Mary Louise McLaughlin, from a 1912 publication.
- Born: Mary Louise McLaughlin; September 29, 1847; Cincinnati, Ohio, United States
- Died: January 13, 1939 (aged 91)
- Resting place: Spring Grove Cemetery, Cincinnati
- Known for: China painting studio pottery

Mary Louise McLaughlin (September 29, 1847 – January 19, 1939) was an American ceramic painter and studio potter from Cincinnati, Ohio, and the main local competitor of Maria Longworth Nichols Storer, who founded Rookwood Pottery. Like Storer, McLaughlin was one of the originators of the art pottery movement that swept the United States.

== Biography ==
Mary Louise McLaughlin was born September 29, 1847, to a wealthy family of Cincinnati, her father being the owner of a successful dry goods company in the city. Her older brother was architect James W. McLaughlin. Showing an artistic ability at a young age, McLaughlin did not take formal art lessons until 1871 at a private school for girls. In 1874, at Cincinnati's McMicken School of Design, later the Art Academy of Cincinnati, McLaughlin took a china painting class offered by a Mr. Benn Pitman. During an exhibition by Maria Longworth Nichols Storer at the school that same year, McLaughlin's interest in painting china ripened.

In 1875, the two women's works were featured at The Centennial Tea Party to critical acclaim, and in 1876 both women had exhibitions at the Centennial Exhibition in Philadelphia, Pennsylvania. While at the exhibition McLaughlin was especially taken by the works presented by Haviland & Co. of France, who showcased pieces that featured paintings using the underglaze technique. Since this was a unique advancement at the time, McLaughlin returned to Cincinnati with the determination to figure out the secret to their method. She also wrote a book on china painting upon her return which sold many copies (China Painting: A Practical Manual for the Use of Amateurs in the Decoration of Hard Porcelain). McLaughlin sold more of her works at the exhibition than Storer did, thus starting a competition of sorts between the two women.

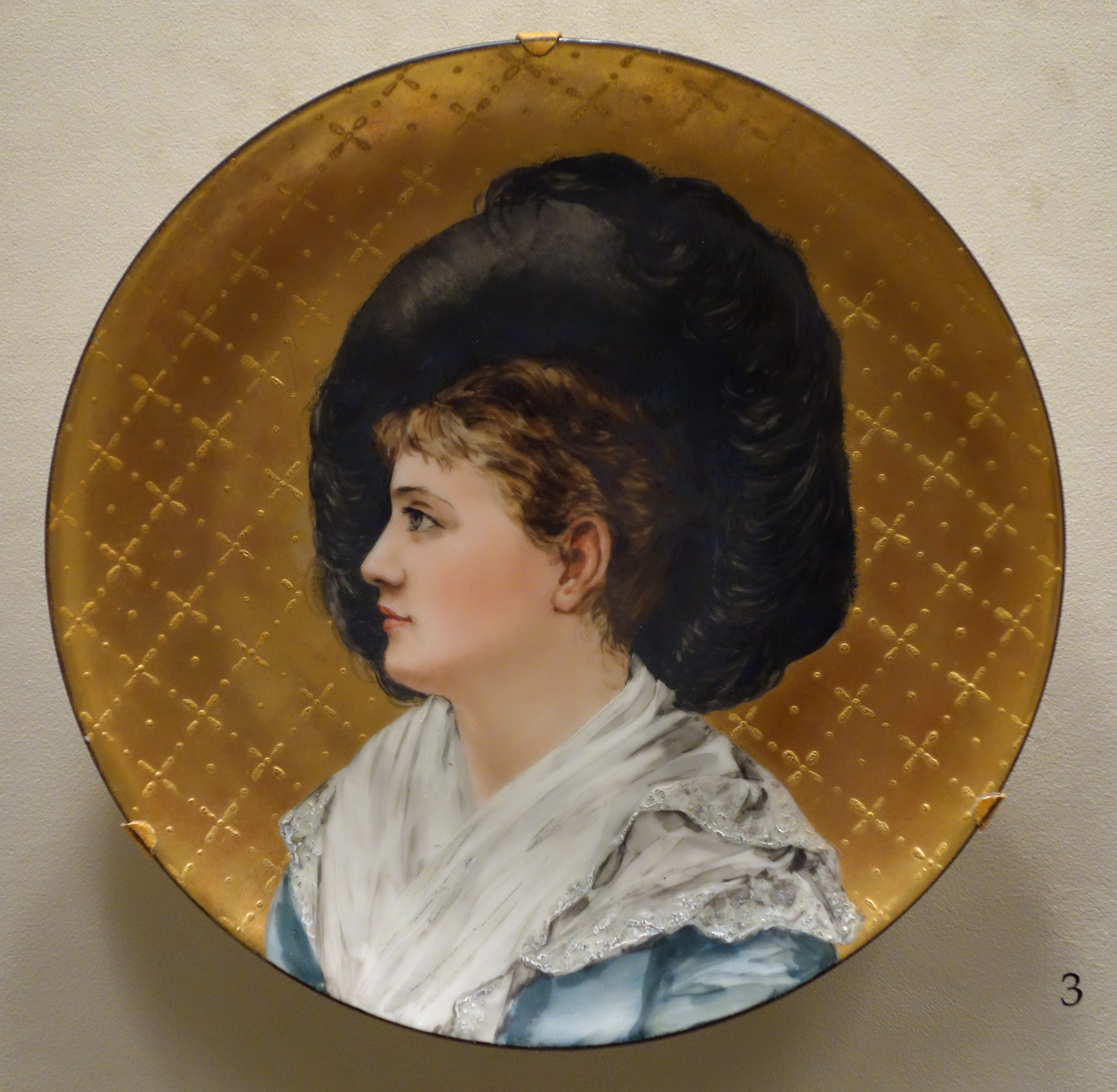
Portrait of Esther McLaughlin (the artist's niece), by Mary Louise McLaughlin, 1882, on porcelain

In 1877 she worked out how to paint the porcelain under the glaze, and consequently became the first artist in the United States to implement the underglaze technique. Eventually other artists began utilizing this same technique, and in 1879 McLaughlin founded the Cincinnati Pottery Club along with Clara Chipman Newton and others. While it might seem logical that Storer would join the group, she declined an invitation to do so. This rivalry is likely what caused her to start Rookwood Pottery in the first place. Each member of the club had their pottery made at the Frederick Dallas Hamilton Road Pottery factory, and they would meet at the Women’s Art Museum Association located on Fourth Street in downtown Cincinnati. Eventually the group moved their meeting to the Dallas shop when the association moved to Cincinnati Music Hall. When Rookwood Pottery was opened, many of the workers from Frederick Dallas joined her team and effectively hindered some of the aspirations of McLaughlin and her group.

In 1880 she published another work, titled Pottery Decoration under the Glaze. By this time the technique was already being implemented in other parts of the country. That same year, McLaughlin created one of her most celebrated vases, the Ali Baba Vase (so named by Newton). At 37 inches high (with a volume of 22 gallons), it was at that time the largest underglaze decorated vase in America. It features loosely painted hibiscus flowers on a sage green ground. Its success prompted Storer to counter with what became another famous piece, the Aladdin Vase, which was wider than the Ali Baba Vase though not as tall.

The following year, Frederick Dallas died and his shop closed, leaving McLaughlin and her club to rent a room at Rookwood Pottery. In 1883 Storer evicted the club due to the conflict of interest involved in housing them, though she continued to have her pottery pieces made at Rookwood. While the club continued to showcase their work, they were outshone by Rookwood during their tenure. This in part caused McLaughlin to take up portrait painting in the 1890s, taking classes from Frank Duveneck in what was his first painting lesson. In 1890 Rookwood had changed ownership, and a William W. Taylor was the new owner. Taylor, under the direction of Storer, started making claims that McLaughlin was not the true discoverer of the underglaze method. He went so far as to demand the withdrawal of a statement by Clara Chipman Newton in an 1893 pottery catalog to the effect that McLaughlin was the founder of the technique in America. This never happened, but the incident effectively terminated any remnants of a relationship the two women had once shared.

McLaughlin exhibited two etchings and a portrait of Henry L. Fry at the Woman's Building at the 1893 World's Columbian Exposition in Chicago, Illinois.

In the 1890s Mclaughlin returned to pottery, this time working out of her own backyard in the studio pottery style (the hardest of its kind). She effectively went from painting porcelain to creating it. Starting from 1885, McLaughlin was assisted in her work by her companion and housekeeper of 47 years, Margaret "Maggie" Hickey. Hickey was an Irish immigrant who started working for McLaughlin when she was about 20 years old. By the winter of 1898-1899 she was doing all the casting of the ware, and by the fall of 1901 she was also managing all the firing. In 1906 Mclaughlin gave up pottery and began writing again. Hickey died in 1932, still working for McLaughlin. In 1934 Grace W. Hazard (1869-1952) replaced Hickey; Hazard called McLaughlin "Ma" and she was the main beneficiary of McLaughlin's will, that was contested by McLaughlin's family. McLaughlin died January 19, 1939, at age ninety-one and is buried in Spring Grove Cemetery. Hazard is buried near her.

== Books ==
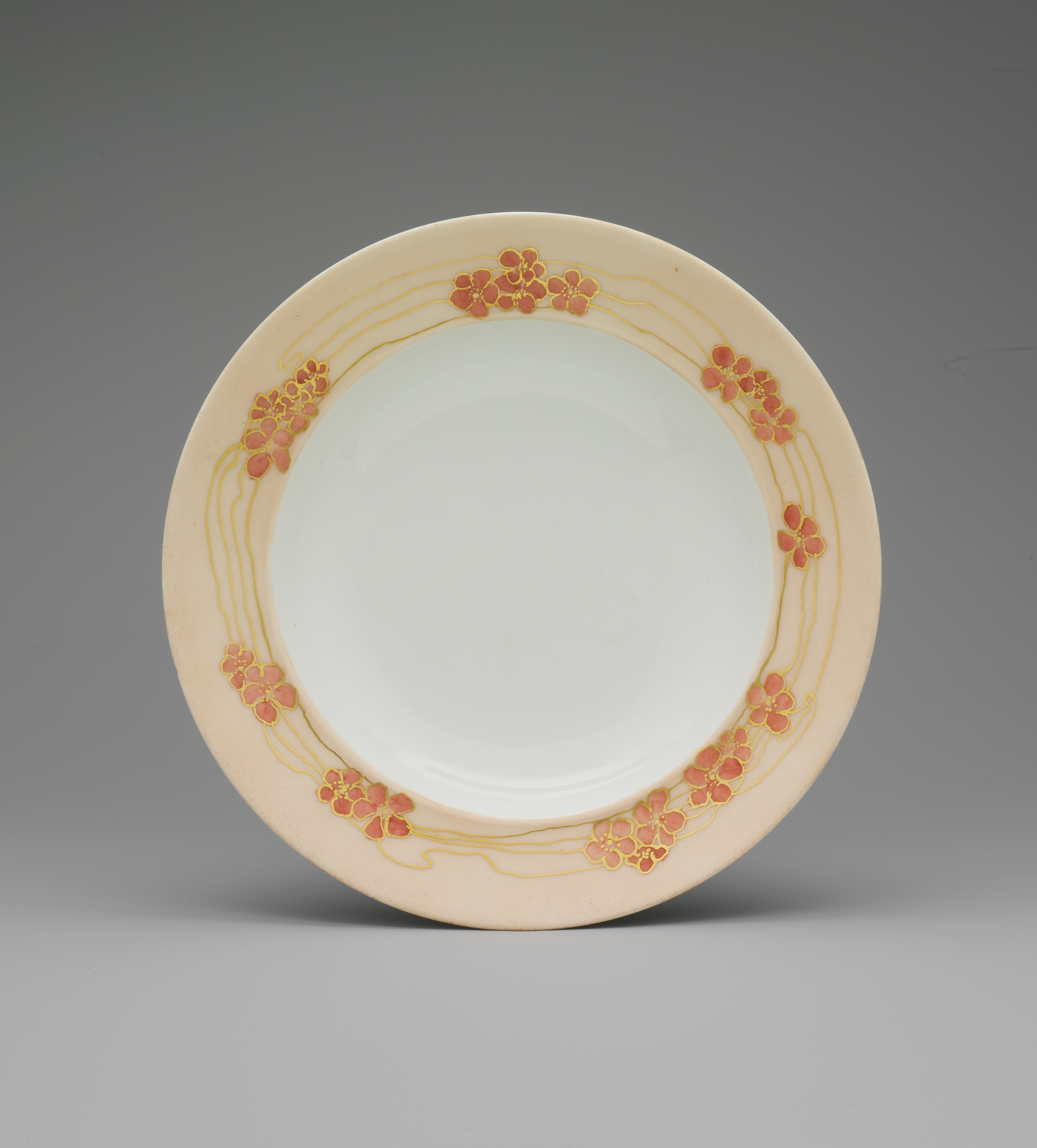
A soup bowl by McLaughlin, now in the Metropolitan Museum of Art

- China Painting: A Practical Manual for the Use of Amateurs in the Decoration of Hard Porcelain (1880)
- Pottery Decoration under the Glaze (1880)
- Painting in Oil: A Manual of Use for Students (1888)
- China Painting: A Practical Manual for the Use of Amateurs in the Decoration of Hard Porcelain (1894)
- An Epitome of History: from Pre-Historic Times to the End of the Great War (1923)
