= Ruth Fainlight =

American poet (born 1931)

Ruth Fainlight FRSL
- Born: 2 May 1931 (age 95); New York City, U.S.
- Occupations: Poet short story writer librettist translator
- Spouse: Alan Sillitoe

Ruth Fainlight, FRSL (born 2 May 1931) is an American-born poet, short story writer, translator and librettist based in the United Kingdom.

== Life and career ==
Ruth Fainlight was born in New York, but has mainly lived in Britain since she was 15, having also spent some years living in France and Spain. She studied for two years at the Birmingham and Brighton Colleges of Art. In addition to her own works, Fainlight has also provided criticism for BBC Radio, The Times Literary Supplement, The Guardian and numerous other publications.

Fainlight was married to the British writer Alan Sillitoe (1928–2010) and has a son, David, who is a photographer for The Guardian, and an adopted daughter, Susan. Fainlight lives in London.

Fainlight has twice been Poet in Residence at Vanderbilt University, Nashville, Tennessee, and was a close friend of Sylvia Plath in the years leading up to Plath's death.

== Publications ==
=== Poetry collections ===
- Cages, 1966.
- To See the Matter Clearly, 1968 from Macmillan UK; Dufour Editions, US
- The Region's Violence, 1973.
- Another Full Moon, 1976.
- Sibyls and Others. 1980. New edition, Poetry Book Society, 2007
- Fifteen to Infinity, 1983. Also published 1987, Carnegie-Mellon University Press US
- Selected Poems. 1987.
- The Knot 1990. from Hutchinson or CenturyHutchinson, UK
- Climates. Bloodaxe Books UK, 1983.
- This Time of Year, 1994.
- Selected Poems. Updated new edition, Sinclair-Stevenson UK, 1995.
- Sugar-Paper Blue. Bloodaxe Books UK, Dufour Editions US, 1997.
  - Shortlisted for 1998 Whitbread Poetry Prize
- Burning Wire. Bloodaxe Books UK, Dufour Editions US, 2002.
- Moon Wheels. Bloodaxe Books, 2006. Dufour Editions US, 2007.
- New and Collected Poems. Bloodaxe Books, 25 November 2010.
- Somewhere Else Entirely. Bloodaxe Books, 15 November 2018.

=== Books ===
- Sibyls. Gehenna Press US, 1991, with woodcuts by Leonard Baskin.
- Pomegranate. Editions de l`Eau, Ceret, France, 1997, mezzotints by Judith Rothchild
- Leaves/Feuilles, Editions Verdigris, Octon, France, 1998. Bi-lingual, French/English, tr. M. Duclos; mezzotints by Judith Rothchild
- Feathers, Editions Verdigris, France, 2002. Mezzotints by Judith Rothchild
- Sheba and Solomon. Pratt Contemporary Art, UK, 2004. Drypoints by Ana Maria Pacheco

=== Short story collections ===
- Daylife and Nightlife. London: André Deutsch, 1971.
- Dr. Clock's Last Case. London: Virago Press, 1994.

=== Translations ===
- Lope de Vega, All Citizens Are Soldiers. Macmillan UK, 1966. Tr. from Spanish (original title: Fuenteovejuna) with Alan Sillitoe
- Navigations 1983, Casa da Moeda, Portugal, and Marine Rose, 1987, Black Swan US, poems, from Portuguese of Sophia de Mello Breyner Andresen
- Selection of poems by Jean Joubert, from French, included in Selected Poems, 1995
- Sophocles, The Theban Trilogy 2009. Translated with Robert Littman, Johns Hopkins University Press, US

=== Poetry collections in translation ===
- La Verità sulla Sibilla, 2003, translated from Italian. Alessandra Schiavinato and Paolo Ruffilli, published by Edizioni del Leone, Venice, Italy
- Visitação, 1995, edited by Ana Hatherly, Quetzal Editores, Lisbon, Portugal
- Encore la Pleine Lune, 1997, trans. M. Duclos & J. Joubert, Editions Federop, Eglise-Neuve d'Issac, France
- Leaves/Feuilles 1998, trans. M. Duclos, Editions Verdigris, Octon, France
- Bleu Papier-Sucre, 2000, trans. M. Duclos, Les Amis de la Poésie, Bergerac, France
- Plumas (Feathers) (in English and Spanish) published by Editorial El Tucan de Virginia, Mexico City, Mexico, 2005.
- Poemas 2000, trans. B. Varela, L. Graves, M. Negroni, J. Capriata, M. Lauer Editorial Pequeña Venecia, Caracas, Venezuela
- Autorul La Rampa, 2007, tr. Lidia Vianu, Univers Enciclopedic, Bucharest, Romania
- La Nueva Ciencia de los Materiales Fuertes (bi-lingual, English/Spanish) 2009,

trans. M. Rosenberg & D. Samoilovich, Cosmopoetica, Cordoba, Spain

=== Poems in translation ===
The poem "Sugar-Paper Blue" was translated into Russian by Marina Boroditskaya and is published in the April 2003 issue of the Moscow monthly Inostrannaya Literatura (Foreign Literature).

The poem sequence "Sheba and Solomon" has been translated into Russian by Marina Boroditskaya and published in Moscow in the literary magazine Novaya Younost in 2003.

=== Libretti ===
- The Dancer Hotoke 1991, composer Erika Fox (nominated for the 1992 Laurence Olivier Awards).
- The European Story 1993, chamber opera, composer Geoffrey Alvarez (based on the poem of the same name). Both works above were commissioned by the Royal Opera House for their "Garden Venture" program in 1991 and 1993.
- Bedlam Britannica September 1995.

== Awards and honours ==
- Cholmondeley Award for Poetry, 1994
- Hawthornden Fellowship, 1987
- Fellow of Royal Society of Literature, 2007
