= Rampant Lion, Manchester =

Listed former pub in England

Rampant Lion
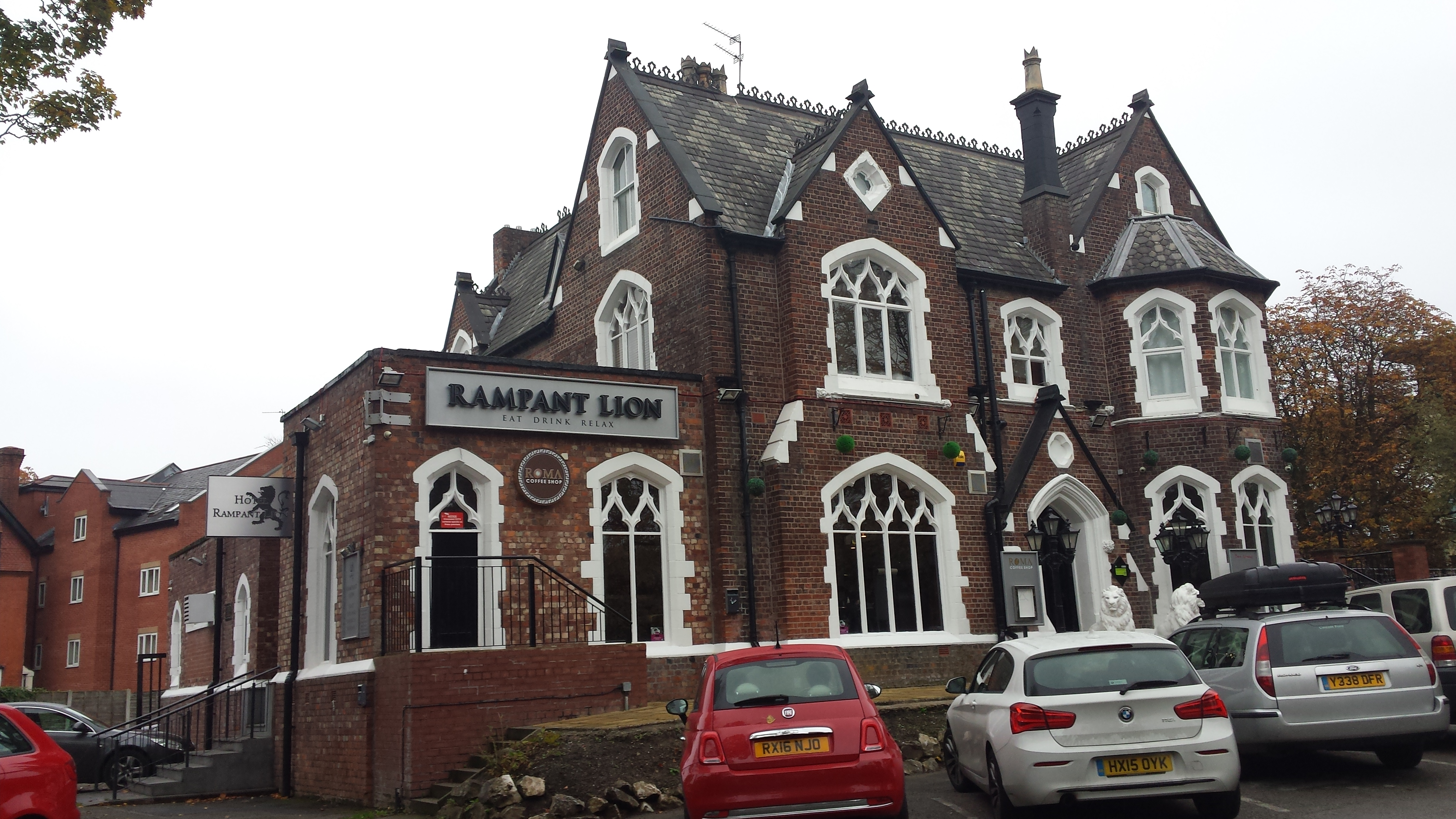
- The former pub in 2016

- Location within Greater Manchester
- Former names: Milverton Lodge
- Alternative names: Milverton Hotel

General information
- Type: Residential (19th century–1960s); Hotel / nightclub (1960s–1980s); Public house (1980s–2013); Hotel (2017–present)
- Architectural style: Gothic
- Location: 17 Anson Road, Victoria Park, Manchester, England
- Coordinates: 53.4565°N 2.2161°W
- Year built: Mid to late 19th century
- Renovated: 1980s and 2017 (converted)

Design and construction
- Designations

Listed Building – Grade II
- Official name: The Rampant Lion public house and attached screen wall
- Designated: 2 May 1973
- Reference no.: 1197827

Website
- Official website

The Rampant Lion (now trading as the Milverton Hotel) is a Grade II listed former public house on Anson Road in Victoria Park, a suburban area of Manchester, England. Built in the mid to late 19th century as a private villa named Milverton Lodge in the Gothic style, it later had a variety of uses, including as a private hotel in the 1960s, a nightclub during the 1970s, and a pub from the 1980s. The pub closed in 2013, and the building was adapted for hotel use in 2017.

== History ==
The building was constructed in the mid to late 19th century as a private villa named Milverton Lodge and set within landscaped grounds. It remained a residence into the 20th century before undergoing a series of changes in use. By the 1960s it was operating as a private hotel, and in the 1970s it was converted into a nightclub.

On 2 May 1973, the building was designated a Grade II listed structure. In the 1980s the property was adapted for use as a public house, trading as the Rampant Lion. During this period it functioned variously as a student‑oriented pub and later a gastropub, with several refurbishments over the years. The pub ceased trading in January 2013.

A planning application approved in 2014 permitted alterations and extensions to facilitate hotel accommodation on the upper floors. The building was subsequently converted to hotel use in 2017, and it now trades as the Milverton Hotel.

== Architecture ==
The building is constructed of red brick with stone details that are now painted white, and it has a slate roof laid out in alternating blue and grey bands with a decorative ridge. Its overall shape is rectangular, but the front is arranged to resemble a main hall with a cross‑wing. It is designed in a Gothic style and has two storeys, along with a cellar and an attic. The front has three main window openings, with a slightly projecting gabled section on the left and another gabled wing on the right that includes a two‑storey bay. The base is finished in stone, the entrance is framed by buttresses, and the gables are steep with stone edging.

The central doorway has a pointed arch with heavy moulding and a small gable above it containing a carved decorative panel. All of the windows have stone surrounds, pointed heads, and tracery in the upper sections. The left side has windows of four and three lights, there are two lights above the entrance, and the bay on the right contains one, two, and one‑light windows. The left gable includes a decorative quatrefoil set within a diamond shape, while the right gable has a small single‑light opening with a flagpole fixed beside it. A tall chimney rises where the main block meets the wing.

A high boundary wall connects to the left corner, and some of the windows on that side match those on the front. A single‑storey extension from the 20th century stands on the right-hand side.

== See also ==
- Listed buildings in Manchester-M14
- Listed pubs in Manchester
