= The Bibelot =

Yearly literary anthology between 1895 and 1914

The Bibelot was a monthly literary periodical edited and published by Thomas Bird Mosher in Portland, Maine, from 1895 to 1914. The periodical reprinted poetry and prose, including lesser-known works by Algernon Charles Swinburne, William Morris, Arthur Symons, Dante Gabriel Rossetti, Austin Dobson, John Addington Symonds, Robert Louis Stevenson, Oscar Wilde, and Fiona Macleod.

In 1925, William H. Wise & Co. issued a 21-volume reprint known as the Testimonial Edition, comprising twenty volumes of the periodical and a general index.

== The Bibelots ==
A separate series titled The Bibelots consisted of twenty-nine small-format reprints of English classics. The series was edited by John Potter Briscoe and published in London by Gay and Bird between 1899 and 1907. It is not known if Gay and Bird had any connection with Thomas Bird Mosher.
