= Leonard Baskin =

American artist (1922–2000)

- Self-portrait as Priest, 1952
- Born: August 15, 1922; New Brunswick, New Jersey, U.S.
- Died: June 3, 2000 (aged 77); Northampton, Massachusetts, U.S.
- Education: New York University; Yale University; The New School (BA); Académie de la Grande Chaumière; Accademia di Belle Arti
- Known for: Sculpture; book illustration; printmaking; graphic designer; founder of the Gehenna Press
- Movement: Boston Expressionism
- Spouses: Esther Baskin (div. 1967) Lisa Unger Baskin (m. 1967)
- Children: 3
- Awards: Prix de Rome; Gold Medal of The American Academy of Arts and Letters; Special Medal of Merit of the American Institute of Graphic Arts; Gold Medal of the National Academy of Design; Widener Medal from the Pennsylvania Academy of the Fine Arts

Leonard Baskin (August 15, 1922 – June 3, 2000) was an American sculptor, draughtsman, and graphic artist, as well as founder of the Gehenna Press (1942–2000). One of America's first fine arts presses, it went on to become "one of the most important and comprehensive art presses of the world", often featuring the work of poets, such as Sylvia Plath, Ted Hughes, Anthony Hecht, and James Baldwin side by side with Baskin's bold, stark, energetic and often dramatic black-and-white prints. Called a "Sculptor of Stark Memorials" by the New York Times, Baskin is also known for his wood, limestone, bronze, and large-scale woodblock prints, which ranged from naturalistic to fanciful, and were frequently grotesque, featuring bloated figures or humans merging with animals. "His monumental bronze sculpture, The Funeral Cortege, graces the Franklin Delano Roosevelt Memorial in Washington, D.C."

== Early life and education ==
Baskin was born in New Brunswick, NJ. When Baskin was seven, the family relocated to the Jewish Orthodox section of Williamsburg in Brooklyn, New York.

Having vowed to become a sculptor at the age of 15, Baskin studied sculpting as an apprentice to Maurice Glickman from 1937 to 1939 at the Educational Alliance in New York City. Baskin studied at the New York University School of Architecture and Applied Arts from 1939 to 1941. In 1941, he won a scholarship to Yale where he studied for two years, and founded the Gehenna Press.

Baskin served in the U.S. Navy during the final years of World War II, and then in the Merchant Navy. He then studied at The New School for Social Research, where he obtained his B.A. in 1949. "In 1950 he went to Paris where he studied at the Academie de la Grande Chaumiere, and the following year to Florence to work at the Accademia di Belle Arti."

== Career ==
=== Early career ===
As a young man, at the height of the flowering Boston Expressionist movement centered around the city's Boris Mirski Gallery, Baskin had his first major solo exhibition there in 1956, on the heels of being one of 11 artists featured in the opening exhibition at the Terrain Gallery. He would go on to participate in another 40 exhibitions. Within a decade, he was featured in the 1966 documentary "Images of Leonard Baskin" by American filmmaker Warren Forma.

=== Teaching career ===
Between 1952 and 1953, he was an instructor in printmaking at the Worcester Art Museum where he taught the artists Joyce Reopel and Mel Zabarsky. In 1953, he began a twenty-year career teaching printmaking and sculpture at Smith College in Northampton, Massachusetts. He was also a member of the Society of American Graphic Artists. After spending several years in the 1970s in England, Baskin returned to the U.S. in 1984, and subsequently taught at Hampshire College in Amherst, Massachusetts.

=== The Gehenna Press ===
Baskin founded the Gehenna Press in 1942, one of the first fine art presses in the U.S., as a student at Yale, inspired by the illustrated books of William Blake, which so impressed him that he decided to learn to print and make his own books. The name was taken from a line in Paradise Lost: "and black Gehenna call'd, the type of hell". The Gehenna Press printed over 100 books and ran until Baskin's death in 2000.

In 1974, Baskin moved with his family to Britain, to Lurley Manor, near Tiverton, Devon, to be close to his friend Ted Hughes, for whom he had illustrated the poetry volume Crow published in 1970. Baskin and Hughes collaborated on several further works, including A Primer of Birds, published by Gehenna Press in 1981. Other poets who collaborated with the Gehenna Press included James Baldwin, Anthony Hecht, Ruth Fainlight, and Anne Halley. Sylvia Plath dedicated "Sculptor" to Leonard Baskin in her work, The Colossus and Other Poems (1960).

"In 1992, a 50-year retrospective of Gehenna Press books toured the country, including a major exhibition at the Library of Congress."

=== Major works and commissions ===
In 1972, Baskin won a Caldecott honor for his illustrations of Hosie's Alphabet, written by his wife, Lisa, and sons Tobias and Hosea, and published by Viking Press. In 1994, he received one of his most important commissions for a 30-foot bas relief for the Franklin Delano Roosevelt Memorial and a bronze statue of a seated figure, also erected in 1994, for the Holocaust Memorial in Ann Arbor, Michigan.

== Artistic style and themes ==
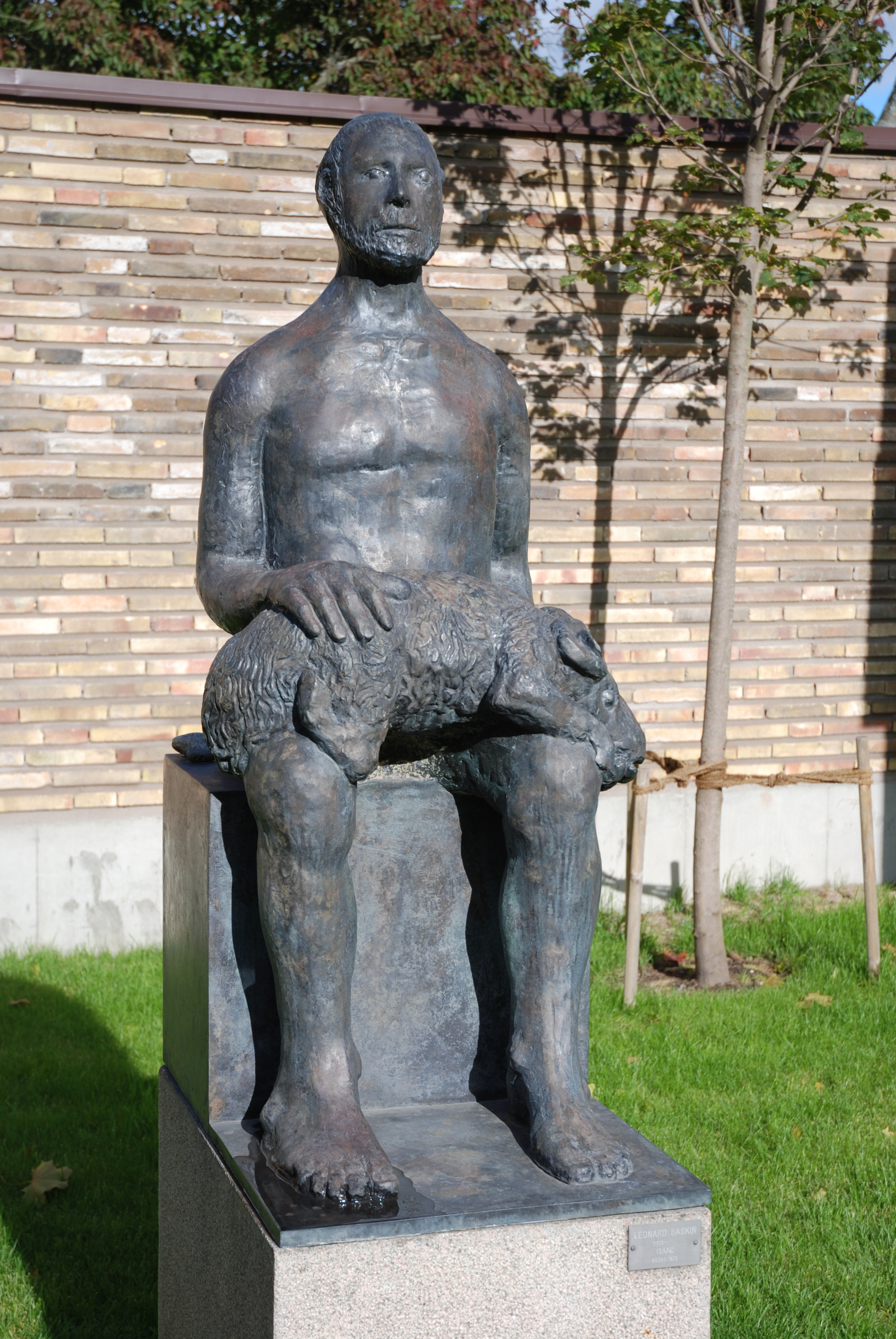
Leonard Baskin, Isak, Marabouparken, Sundbyberg, Sweden

A committed figurative artist and the son and brother of rabbis, Baskin's work often focused on mortality, Judaism, the Holocaust, and other angst-ridden themes. Repeating a Baskin quote first published in Time magazine, the New York Times' Roberta Smith cites it to explain Baskin's allegiance to figurative work and respect for tradition, which was at odds with the abstract expressionist movement that dominated modern art for many decades of his life, and which he firmly rejected:

Our human frame, our gutted mansion, our enveloping sack of beef and ash is yet a glory. Glorious in defining our universal sodality and in defining our utter uniqueness. The human figure is the image of all men and of one man. It contains all and can express all.

== Recognition and legacy ==
Baskin's work is held by major museums worldwide, including the American Numismatic Society, the Amon Carter Museum, the Art Institute of Chicago, the Art Museum of Southeast Texas, Boca Raton Museum of Art, the British Museum, Brooklyn Museum, Brooks Memorial Art Gallery, Detroit Institute of Arts, Hirshhorn Museum and Sculpture Garden, the Honolulu Museum of Art, Indianapolis Museum of Art, the Jewish Museum, the Library of Congress, Metropolitan Museum of Art, MOMA, Museum of Fine Arts, Boston, Muscarelle Museum of Art, the National Gallery of Art, the New Jersey State Museum, The Newark Museum of Art, Princeton University, Seattle Art Museum, Smithsonian American Art Museum, the Udinotti Museum of Figurative Art, Victoria and Albert Museum, the Vatican Museums, Wesleyan University, Whitney Museum of American Art, and the Worcester Art Museum.

The archive of his work at the Gehenna Press was acquired by the Bodleian Library at Oxford, England, in 2009. "A catalogue raisonné of Baskin's graphic works includes 739 works," and the McMaster Museum of Art in Hamilton, Ontario owns over 200 of his works, most of which were donated by his brother Rabbi Bernard Baskin. The Philadelphia Museum of Art has a collection of over 800 of his works.

Baskin was the recipient of six honorary doctorates and a member of various national and royal academies in Belgium, Italy, and the U.S. The National Foundation of Jewish Culture in the U.S. presented him with its Jewish Cultural Achievement Award in Visual Arts in 2000. Other honors and commendations include the:

- Alonzo C. Mather Prize, Art Institute of Chicago
- American Academy of Arts and Sciences, Fellow
- Gold Medal of The American Academy of Arts and Letters
- Gold Medal of the National Academy of Design
- Guggenheim Fellowship in Creative Printings
- Louis Comfort Tiffany Foundation Fellowship for Sculpture
- National Academy of Design, elected an Associate in 1985; became full member in 1994
- Ohara Museum Prize
- Prix de Rome, Honorable Mention for Sculpture
- Special Medal of Merit of the American Institute of Graphic Arts
- Widener Medal from the Pennsylvania Academy of the Fine Arts

== Personal life ==
Baskin was first cousin to American modern dancer and choreographer Sophie Maslow. His first wife, Esther Baskin, a nature writer, the author of Creatures of Darkness and The Poppy and Other Deadly Plants, and mother to son Tobias, died in 1973 at age 47. Baskin died at age 77 on June 3, 2000, in Northampton, where he resided. He was survived by his second wife Lisa Unger Baskin and their two children Hosea and Lucretia.
