= Thomas Bird Mosher =

American publisher

Thomas Bird Mosher (1852–1923) was an American publisher out of Portland, Maine. He is notable for his contributions to the private press movement in the United States, and as a major exponent of the British Pre-Raphaelites and Aesthetes as well as other British Victorians. His book styles reflected those of William Pickering and the Whittinghams, the books of the Bodley Head, the Daniel Press, the Eragny Press and Charles Ricketts of the Vale Press, among others.

== Early life ==
Thomas B. Mosher was the son of Mary Elizabeth Merrill and Benjamin Mosher, a captain of merchant ships engaged in the China trade during the Age of Sail. He was born in Biddeford, Maine.

Mosher attended the Quincy Grammar School in Boston, Massachusetts, graduating at age 12, the only formal schooling he would complete. Mosher then spent several years accompanying his father on voyages, including an 1866 trip around Cape Horn. Along the way, he read an edition of Bell's British Theatre which his father had given him, which contributed to a growing love of literature.

Mosher returned to New England, arriving in Maine in 1870. He briefly enrolled at Phillips Exeter Academy, but did not stay long. At some point in 1870 or 1871, he secretly married Ellen S. "Ellie" Dresser, and would climb up to her window to see her at night. Eventually they were discovered and at their families' insistence had a public wedding ceremony on July 4, 1871.

At this point, Mosher left his father's home, holding a series of jobs in Portland, St. Louis, New York City and Philadelphia through the 1870s. His first position was working for his wife's uncle Aurin Dresser at the stationery firm of Dresser, McClellan and Company, other positions included working in bookshops and selling printing equipment.

Between 1879 and 1885, his wife left him, his best friend (Leopold Lobsitz, a student at Harvard Medical School) suddenly died, Aurin Dresser died, and his father died. After Dresser's death, Mosher and others tried to maintain the business as McClellan, Mosher and Company, but in 1889, the Portland stationery and law book supply firm went bankrupt. Emerging from the bankruptcy, Mosher opened a wholesale business which manufactured various stationery materials, which finally provided him with a stable income.

== Publishing ==
In 1891, Mosher published his first book, a poem titled Modern Love by George Meredith, without the author's knowledge or permission. The next year he published James Thomson's The City of Dreadful Night, and the year after that, 1893, he published two books, including his first anthology, Songs of Adieu. In 1894, two more books and the first of his well-known catalogs came out, and 1895 saw a further 8 titles and the first issue of The Bibelot. Thus by 1895, he had published 16 books, and decided to sell his stationery business and publish full-time.

In 1892, Mosher married again, to Anna M. Littlefield.

By the end of Mosher’s publishing program in 1923 there would be 384 titles, 338 reprints of those editions, and 61 “privately printed” books for a total of 783 books grouped into fourteen different series, all limited editions, covering his favorite authors including William Morris, Oscar Wilde, Fiona Macleod (William Sharp), Robert Louis Stevenson, Algernon Charles Swinburne, Walter Pater, Dante Gabriel Rossetti, Richard Jeffries, Vernon Lee (Violet Paget), Edward FitzGerald, Walt Whitman, Andrew Lang, George Meredith, John Addington Symons, Elizabeth Barrett Browning, Robert Browning, Matthew Arnold, Maurice Hewlett, Francis Thompson, Marcel Schwob, J. W. Mackail, Ernest Dowson, John Ruskin, George Gissing, William Butler Yeats, Richard Burton, and others.
