= Daniel Press =

Private press in England

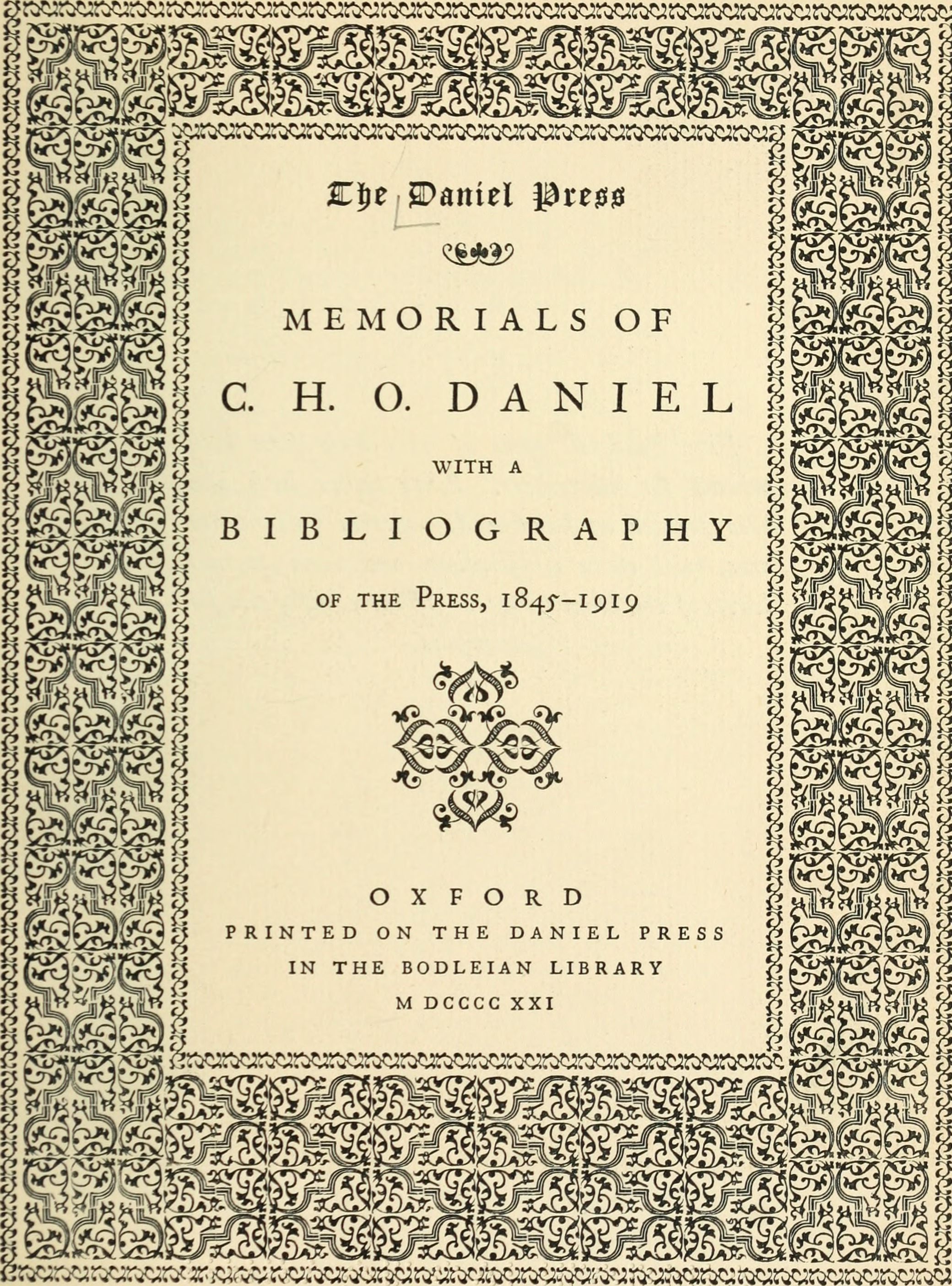
Title-page of The Daniel press. Memorials of C. H. O. Daniel, with a bibliography of the press, 1845-1919 (1921)

The Daniel Press was a private press in England, run by Charles Henry Olive Daniel (1836–1919), his wife Emily and later even their daughters, firstly at Frome and afterwards in Oxford.

Henry Daniel began printing in 1845, when still a schoolboy, at Frome in Somerset, and he continued to print books and ephemera well into the twentieth century, latterly at Oxford where he ultimately became Provost of Worcester College.

His typography was antiquarian in style, and the quality of his printing might be described as vigorous rather than fine. However, he was a great enthusiast for letterpress, and is notable for the early date of his private press activities (starting more than forty years before William Morris conceived the Kelmscott Press and the so-called 'private press movement' began).

The Daniel Press is interesting too for the works printed and published there, including reprints of little-known early-modern texts, major works by Keats, Milton and others, and original literature, including poetry by his friend Robert Bridges. In 1881 he printed The garland of Rachel by divers kindly hands to mark the first birthday of his daughter of that name. Daniel persuaded many of the leading English poets of the day, including Bridges, Austin Dobson, Andrew Lang, John Addington Symonds, Lewis Carroll and Edmund Gosse to contribute.

He was also notable for using the Fell types, and a number of historical ornaments, cast by Oxford University Press when these were considered unfashionable by most other printers and publishers.

In his later years Daniel's printing activities declined. On his death in 1919 his large Albion press (acquired in 1887) and types were bequeathed to the Bodleian Library. Here they were used (by a team of compositors and pressmen borrowed from the University Press) to print an account of Daniel's life and work as a printer and man of letters, with an extensive bibliography written by Falconer Madan. The press and some of the Fell types are still held by the Library, and are now used for teaching.

The Daniel Press was inherited by Daniel's nephew, Henry Martin Daniel (1888-1955), who used it to print and publish his own His Majesty's Valiants: Being a Short Account of Valiant Deeds Accomplished by the King's and Queen's Ships of that Name Between the Years 1759 and 1922 in 1923, to the chagrin of Emily Daniel, the founder's widow. H. M. Daniel, a Royal Navy officer, was famously court-martialled in the Royal Oak affair of 1928 and subsequently worked as a journalist.
