= Glen Loates =

Canadian artist (born 1945)

Personal details
- Born: Martin Glen Loates; May 3, 1945 (age 81) Toronto, Ontario, Canada
- Spouse: Sara Loates
- Children: 2
- Profession: Artist

Martin Glen Loates (born May 3, 1945) is a Canadian artist who paints wildlife and landscapes in a naturalistic style. Loates has designed a number of coins for the Royal Canadian Mint. In 1982, the former Canadian Prime Minister Pierre Elliott Trudeau arranged for Loates to meet with US President Ronald Reagan in the Oval Office to present his painting, The Bald Eagle to the American people on behalf of Canada. Loates' paintings have been gifted to Prince Philip, Duke of Edinburgh, and Pierre Elliot Trudeau.

In the 1984 book A Brush With Life, Glen Loates explained his love for his nature saying, "I've taken more from nature than I can ever give in return. I owe so much, having painted all these beautiful things. If I can assist in preserving natural areas by lending my name to conservation projects or by using my art to draw attention to environmental issues, I feel I'm repaying an enormous debt of gratitude."

His work has been featured in several publications, including GEO, Time, and Reader's Digest.

== Early life ==
Loates became interested in art at a young age by exploring the woods around the family house in Toronto, Ontario, and was introduced to watercolours by Frederick Henry (Fred) Brigden, founder of the Canadian Society of Painters in Water Colour. Bridgen encouraged Loates to focus on drawing wildlife, but Loates also continued to draw comics for his own enjoyment.

At age 11, Loates drew the iconic yellow daffodil that has represented the Canadian Cancer Society for over 40 years.

== Career ==
=== Painting ===
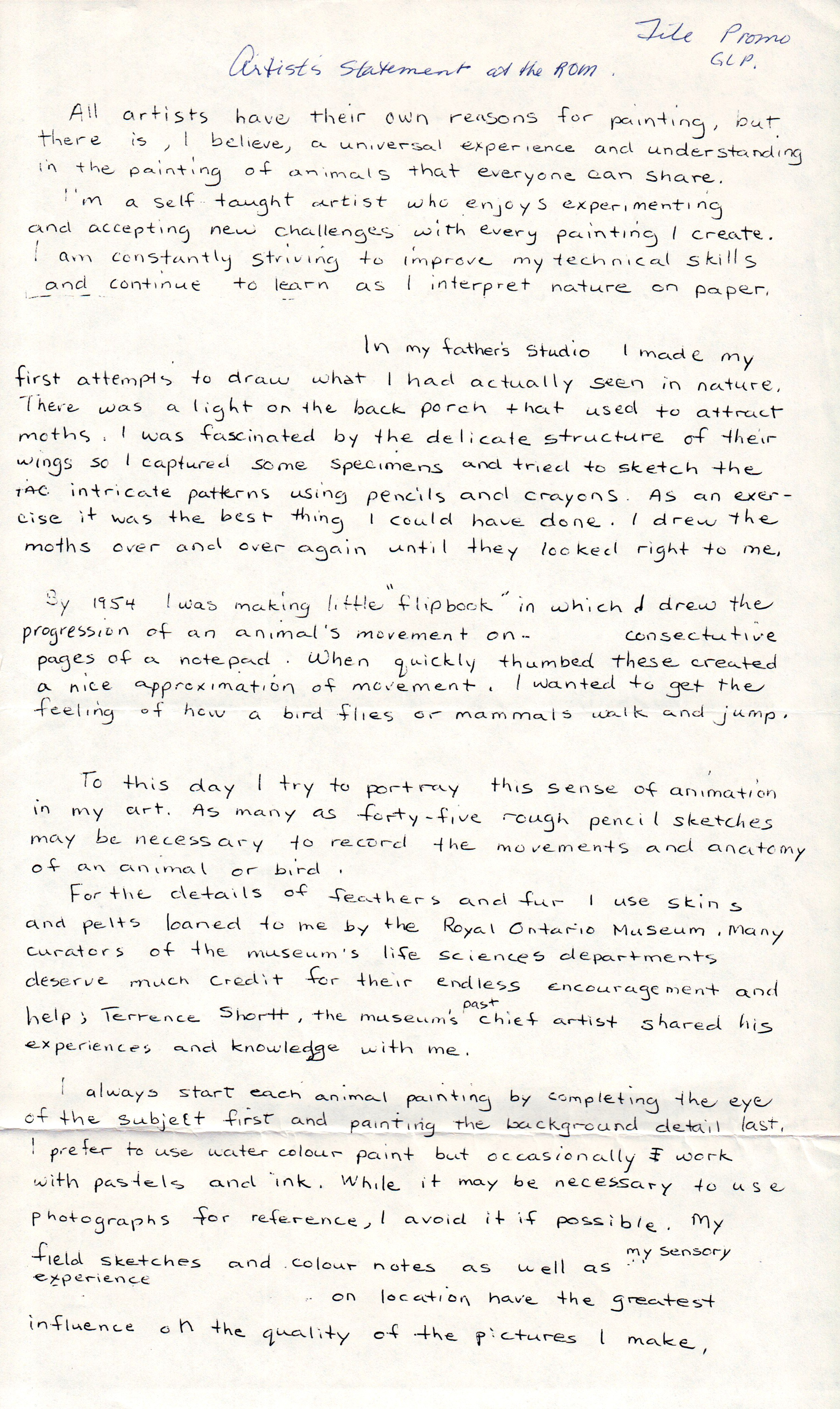
Artist's statement - Royal Ontario Museum

Loates had a big break in 1964 when the Federation of Ontario Naturalists asked him to paint its Christmas card. One of the recipients of the card was the editor of The Canadian magazine. He arranged for a colour spread of Loates' paintings which was so successful, a second was soon scheduled. By the time he was 20 years old, Loates had garnered hordes of fans and was preparing for his first exhibition at the Royal Ontario Museum.

In the 1960s and 1970s, Loates had become known for his wildlife art with numerous art shows and publications and has presented a painting to President Ronald Reagan to be placed in the Oval Office in 1982. Prince Philip and Pierre Elliott Trudeau, also held Loates work in their private collections.

Loates has been the subject of several documentaries, one of which was Color it Living. Limited edition copies of Loates' first book, its 24-carat gold-edged pages bound in Brazilian steerhide, now command more than $6,000.

=== Excursions and film ===
Loates became involved with National Geographic and The Explorers Club's Beebe Project, named for William Beebe which took him in a different direction with his art. Loates made three deep dives in a mini-submersible with this scientific team to illustrate the deep ocean colours and creatures off the coast of Bermuda. He went on to make another deep dive with Dr. Frederick Aldrich of the Memorial University of Newfoundland to search off the Grand Banks of Newfoundland for the elusive giant squid. National Geographic's documentary One Half Mile Down documented the Beebe Project and showed Loates working with "shark lady", Dr. Eugenie Clark, Dr. Joe MacInnis, Teddy Tucker, Emory Kristof, and Peter Benchley.

In June 1988, Loates was given a conservationist award from the Ontario Natural Resources Minister Vincent Kerrio for his contributions as the conservation ambassador MNR's Wingham district.

=== Coins ===
Loates has designed many coins for the Royal Canadian Mint, often but not always featuring wildlife. Coins include both 1 kg solid silver/1 kg solid gold Kermode bear coins (2017), the first coin to feature diamond glitter (2017), a colorized beaver silver coin (2017), a pure gold 1 kg couger coin (2015), and coins in the $20 for $20 series. Glen's first coins were set of 4 platinum 1991 Snowy Owls for the $30, $75, $150 and $300.

Loates designed the reverse of the 2015 "In Flanders Field" themed circulation $2 coin which celebrated the 100th anniversary of the writing the poem which resulted in poppies becoming a symbol of Remembrance Day in Canada. 5 million Loates-designed $2 coins were minted for circulation.

== Exhibitions ==
Loates has been exhibited at the following:

- October to November 1965 - solo exhibition at the Royal Ontario Museum, Glen Loates Watercolours
- October 1976 - selected works at Eaton's Art Gallery
- February 1982 - solo exhibition at Kortright Centre for Conservation, Kleinburg
- February to May 1985 - solo exhibition at Royal Ontario Museum, Glen Loates: A Brush with Life
- August 1985 - Durham Show, Viletta China Canada Limited
- November to Dec 1985 - Beckett Gallery, Hamilton, Ontario
- October 1986 - Glen Loates at The Gallery, Peterborough, Ontario
- October 1987 - Art for the Birds, A Royal Ontario Museum Auction
- November 1987 - solo exhibition at Galerie Westmount, Montreal, Quebec
- December 1987 to February 1988 - The Art of Survival - la Survivance et l'art (Group Exhibition), Royal Ontario Museum, Canada
- October 1998 - solo exhibition at Rocky Mountain Art Galleries Ltd, Ontario Canada

His work has also been exhibited in various galleries and museums which include:

- Alexander Koenig Museum
- Institute of Zoological Research
- The Centre Culturel Paris
- British Museum
- The McMichael Canadian Collection
- Palette Art Gallery
- Cottage Craft Gifts and Fine Arts Ltd.
- Whetung Art Gallery
- The Village Square Art Gallery

== Publications ==
Books published about art by Loates include:

- The Art of Glen Loates by Paul Duval, 1977
- Birds of North America by Dr. Ross James, 1979.
- Animals of Canada by Anonymous and Illustrated by Glen Loates in 1970
- Glen Loates: A Brush With Life by Glen Warner in 1984
- From the Wild: Portfolios of North America's Finest Wildlife Artists (Claudio D'Angelo, Glen Loates, George McLean, Bob Kuhn, John Schoenherr, Terry Shortt) edited by Christopher Hume in 1986

== Documentaries ==
- 1968 - Colour It Living, filmed and directed by Don Gray for CBC-TV, part of an Audubon television series
- 1971 - A Brush With Life, written and directed by John Lackie for CBC's The Nature of Things
- 1979 - Paint It Wild, written and directed by John Lackie for CBC. Screened at the Royal Ontario Museum
- 1988 - One Half Mile Down, National Geographic, produced by Emory Kristof, on the underwater research carried out as The Beebe Project. Loates was the first artist to descend 1 3/ 4 miles in a submersible, to see and paint deep-sea life.

== Personal life ==
Loates lives with his wife Sara in Vaughan, Ontario. He has 2 sons, Michael and Christopher.
