= Rampant Lions Press =

British letterpress firm

- Industry: Letterpress printing
- Founded: 1924; 101 years ago
- Founder: Will Carter
- Defunct: 2008
- Headquarters: Cambridge, England
- Key people: Sebastian Carter

The Rampant Lions Press was a fine letterpress printing firm in Britain, operating from 1924 to 2008. The firm was founded by Will Carter (24 September 1912 – 17 March 2001), publishing its first book in 1936, and was continued by his son, Sebastian Carter (b. 1941), from 1966.

== History ==
Rampant Lions started life as a private press in 1924, when Will Carter was still a schoolboy. After the war, his interest in printing was such that he decided to try to establish the Press on a commercial footing, and did so in Cambridge in 1949. From that date until the formal closure of the Press at the end of 2008, Rampant Lions has been among the most highly regarded letterpress printing-offices in Britain. The skills of Will and Sebastian Carter in design and press-work have been recognized by publishers, who commissioned work from them. Their skills have also been recognized by collectors, who have sought out their publications since the 1950s. Sebastian Carter also has an international reputation as a writer on type and typography and is the author of several books, including in 2013 The Rampant Lion Press: A Narrative Catalogue.

Besides printing, Carter also designed two fonts for Monotype, Klang and Octavian, the latter with David Kindersley. He also designed signage and a font for Dartmouth College, where he was artist-in-residence for a time.

== Legacy ==
At the Fitzwilliam Museum from 18 March to 18 May 2014, the exhibition The Rampant Lions Press: A Letterpress Odyssey took place, featuring books published since 1982, when the press had been the subject of a retrospective exhibition there, celebrating A Printing Workshop Through Five Decades. The retrospective Will Carter: Man of Letters took place at the Lettering Arts Centre, Snape Maltings, Suffolk, in April 2022, and subsequently at the Robert Cripps Gallery, Magdalene College, Cambridge.
