= Vee Guthrie =

American book illustrator (1920–2012)

- Born: Viola May Guthrie; July 27, 1920
- Died: July 6, 2012 (aged 91)
- Occupation: Illustrator

Vee Guthrie (July 27, 1920—July 6, 2012) was an American illustrator of children's books and cookbooks.

== Life and career ==
Viola May Guthrie was born on July 27, 1920, in Fort Smith, Arkansas, to parents Matthew Hardin Guthrie and Flora Guthrie (née Flora Hawthorn Taft). She had ancestry from Scotland and was related to the American colonial Guthries that descended from Clan Guthrie. She grew up in Long Island, New York. Guthrie graduated from The Women's College of Middlebury in 1942 with a Bachelor of Arts in American literature and was a member of Phi Beta Kappa. She also studied at the Art Students League of New York.

In 1944, she worked as an engineering aid at Grumman Aircraft in Long Island, New York. During World War II, she became an officer of the WAVES and was stationed at the Philadelphia Navy Yard until 1946, when she was discharged. She then attended the Rhode Island School of Design with the support of the GI Bill.

While living in Scarsdale, New York, she illustrated the 1957 book Let's Go to The Library, written by Naomi Buchheimer. Guthrie previously illustrated another book in the series, titled Let's Take a Trip to a Firehouse, also written by Buchheimer. The books were meant to supplement schools taking field trips to community service locations.

Guthrie illustrated the children's book titled Cooking Fun (1960), which was written by her sister, Barbara Guthrie McDonald. She illustrated another book by her sister, a cookbook titled Casserole Cooking Fun.

She illustrated various children's books, including Golly and the Gulls (1962), written by Ruth Harnden, and A Sight of Everything (1963), written by Dorothea J. Snow. She also illustrated covers for Child Life Magazine, and created illustrations for arithmetic books, song books and holiday cookbooks. She specifically created holiday cookbooks for the Peter Pauper Press.

In 1964, the book The High Pasture, written by Ruth P. Harnden and illustrated by Guthrie, won the Children's Book Committee Award from Bank Street College.

In 1969, Guthrie was a first grade teacher in Claverack, New York.

Guthrie lived with author Ruth Harnden in Plymouth, Massachusetts near the shore of the Billington Sea.

Guthrie died on July 6, 2012.

== Works ==
- Recipes Mothers Used to Make (c. 1952), compiled by Edna Beilenson
- Book of Christmas Carols (c. 1952)
- The Holiday Cook Book and The Holiday Drink Book (c. 1952)
- Holiday Cookies (c. 1956), compiled by Edna Beilenson
- Benjamin Lucky, written by Miriam E. Mason. Macmillan, 1956.
- Freddy, written by Miriam E. Mason. Macmillan, 1957.
- A Small Farm for Andy, written by Miriam E. Mason. Macmillan, 1958.
- Cooking Fun (1960), written by Barbara Guthrie McDonald
- Jim and His Monkey (c. 1960), written by Bianca Bradbury
- Aesop with a Smile (c. 1960), written by Ernestine Cobern Beyer
- Golly and the Gulls (1962), written by Ruth Harnden
- The Story of Little Big (1962), written by Ernestine Cobern Beyer
- A Sight of Everything (1963), written by Dorothea J. Snow
- The High Pasture (c. 1964), written by Ruth Harnden
- Make Room for Rags (c. 1965), written by Laura Bannon
- Casserole Cooking Fun (c. 1967), written by Barbara Guthrie McDonald
- Animals from A to Z (c. 1969), written and illustrated by Vee Guthrie
