= Robert Leslie =

Robert Leslie may refer to:

- Robert Leslie (bishop) (died 1672), Bishop of Clogher
- Robert Sterritt Leslie (1875–1958), Saskatchewan politician
- Robert Leslie (photographer), photographer
- Robbie Leslie, disc jockey
- Robert L. Leslie (1885–1987), graphic designer
- Robert Burton Leslie (1891–1976), Commander of the Ceylon Defence Force, 1935–1937
- Robert Frank Leslie (1918–2002), professor of history
- Tim Leslie (Robert Timothy Leslie, born 1942), California state legislator

== See also ==
- Robert Leslie-Carter (born 1970), British engineer
- Leslie (name)
