= Luxi fonts =

Humanist sans-serif typeface

Luxi Sans
- Category: Sans-serif
- Classification: Humanist
- Designer(s): Kris Holmes and Charles Bigelow
- Foundry: Bigelow & Holmes
- Date released: 2001

Luxi is a family of typefaces originally designed for the X Window System by Kris Holmes and Charles Bigelow from Bigelow & Holmes Inc. The Luxi typefaces are similar to Lucida – their previous font design.

Luxi fonts were once commonly distributed with free software operating systems, such as Linux. They were featured as the default fonts for Red Hat's Bluecurve theme. Released under a licence which permits free distribution but not modification, the Luxi fonts are not free software. This led to their removal from Debian package of XFree86 as well as Fedora.

== Typefaces ==
- Luxi Sans, a family of four sans-serif fonts.
- Luxi Serif, a family of four serif fonts.
- Luxi Mono, a family of four monospace fonts.

== History ==
- Only version 1.2 (created on 2001-10-12) is available.
- Inititially, they appeared as Type 1 fonts under the name Lucidux in XFree86 4.0 (released on 2000-03-08, added to XFree86 3.9.18Za a day earlier).
- They are available as TTF fonts since XFree86 4.2.0 (18 January 2002); they were added to the XFree86 source tree on 12 December 2001 (XFree86 4.1.99.2).
