= Lucida Sans Unicode =

Humanist sans-serif typeface

- Category: Sans-serif
- Classification: Humanist
- Designer: Charles Bigelow Kris Holmes
- Foundry: Bigelow & Holmes
- Date released: 1993
- Sample

Lucida Sans Unicode is an OpenType typeface from the design studio of Bigelow & Holmes, designed to support the most commonly used characters defined in version 1.0 of the Unicode standard. It is a sans-serif variant of the Lucida font family and supports Latin, Greek, Cyrillic and Hebrew scripts, as well as all the characters used in the International Phonetic Alphabet.

It is the first Unicode encoded font to include non-Latin scripts (Greek, Cyrillic, Hebrew). It was designed by Kris Holmes and Charles Bigelow in 1993, and was first shipped with the Microsoft Windows NT 3.1 operating system.

The font comes pre-installed with all Microsoft Windows versions since Windows 98. A nearly identical font, called Lucida Grande, shipped as the default system font with Apple's Mac OS X operating system, until switching to Helvetica Neue in 2014 with OS X Yosemite; Lucida Grande added support for Arabic and Thai scripts.

Letters in the International Phonetic Alphabet, particularly upside down letters, are aligned for easy reading upside down. Thus, the font is among the most ideal for upside-down text, compared to other Unicode typefaces, which have the turned "t" and "h" characters aligned with their tops at the base line and thus appear out of line.

The typeface has a flaw in the combining low line character (U+0332) and the combining double low line character (U+0333), which are rendered as a blank or as a simple tiny underline when font-size is less than 238 point or so in word processors.

Other well-known Unicode fonts include Code2000, Arial Unicode MS, and the various Free software Unicode typefaces.

== See also ==
- List of typefaces
- Unicode typeface
