= Luxi =

Luxi may refer to

== China ==
- Luxi City (潞西市), currently Mang City, Yunnan
- Luxi County, Hunan (泸溪县)
- Luxi County, Jiangxi (芦溪县)
- Luxi County, Yunnan (泸西县)

Towns

- Luxi, Hubei (陆溪镇), in Jiayu County
- Luxi, Wuning County (鲁溪镇), Jiangxi

Written as "芦溪镇":

- Luxi, Fujian, in Pinghe County
- Luxi, Pingxiang, seat of Luxi County, Jiangxi
- Luxi, Santai County, Sichuan
- Luxi, Nanchong, in Shunqing District, Nanchong, Sichuan

Townships

- Luxi Township, Anhui (芦溪乡), in Qimen County
- Luxi Township, Jiangxi (芦溪乡), in Yongxin County
- Luxi Township, Zhejiang (鹿西乡), in Dongtou County

== India ==
- Luxi, Nancowry, a village in Andaman & Nicobar Islands

== Other ==
- Luxi (fonts)
- Acyl-homoserine-lactone synthase, an enzyme
