= Ernestine Cobern Beyer =

American poet

Ernestine Cobern Beyer (August 4, 1893 – December 13, 1972) was an American poet and children's author.

== Early life ==
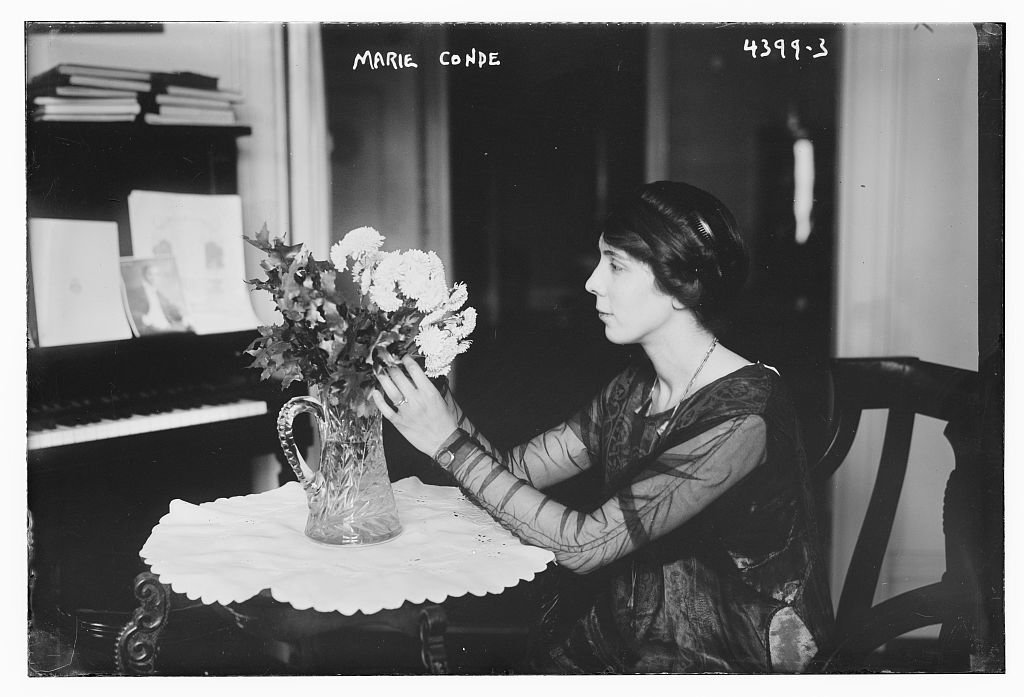

Beyer was born in Meadville, Pennsylvania to Ernestine Craft Cobern, and Camden McCormack Cobern, a Methodist minister, archaeologist, and author of many articles and books on his explorations in Palestine. Born with a coloratura soprano voice, Beyer progressed, with her mother as teacher and accompanist, from simple songs in English to operatic arias in French, Italian, and German. As a teenager, Beyer began studying with the best teachers available. At the age of 21, she obtained a contract with the Metropolitan Opera Company.

== Career ==
In 1912, at age 18, Ernestine married David Stewart Beyer, a safety engineer at Liberty Mutual Insurance Company in Boston, Massachusetts. They had three children, Richard (1915), Barbara (1921) and Janeth (1924-2013). At the time of her opera debut, on January 15, 1918, America was at war with Germany. The name Beyer had a Germanic sound, so she was advised to adopt a stage name. As Maria Conde, she sang the role of Gilda in the opera Rigoletto, opposite Enrico Caruso, the Italian tenor, who played the Duke. The New York Journal American wrote: "Maria Conde took the public by surprise when she soared into tonal altitudes beyond the normal range of coloratura sopranos." The Evening Sun wrote: "If she can support it with physical stamina, hers will develop into the voice of a generation." (Decades later, Child Life editor Ernest Frawley would make a similar comment about Beyer's poetry: “I believe you stand a good chance of becoming the greatest children's poet of the day.") Managed by impresario Aaron Richmond, Beyer realized that the combination of the demands of family life and frequent colds hindered her operatic career.

Beyer began writing poetry. For 25 years she submitted poems and stories to children's magazines, and often had her work published.

On June 27, 1937, Beyer's husband, David Stewart Beyer died in Newton Centre, Massachusetts, and she struggled to support her children. A breakthrough came one sunny afternoon when she watched three toddlers playing on a beach. Inspired by the sight, she wrote the following poem:

One wears a bonnet of organdy rose
That hides her adorable bangs,
And one wears a bonnet that shadows her nose,
And one wears a bonnet that hangs.

The first wears a pinafore (not very white!)
The second, a dress that is tidy.
But the belle of the beach is the third little mite
With the slightly inadequate didy!

— Ernestine Cobern Beyer, Sunbonnet Babies

The publication of "Sunbonnet Babies" in the Ladies' Home Journal (April 1949) marked a change in Beyer's fortunes. The 1950s and 1960s were productive years. She wrote several books for children, continued to appear in children's magazines, including Child Life, Jack and Jill, Wee Wisdom, Highlights for Children), and gave talks in schools and libraries on the power of the subconscious mind. She received several awards from The National League of American Pen Women, and in April 1972 was invited to Washington to be honored by the league for the best religious poem. Beyer died eight months later on December 13, 1972.

== Published books ==
- Beyer, E. (1952). Happy Animal Families. Grosset & Dunlap.
- Beyer, E. (1960). Aesop with a Smile. The Reilly & Lee Co. Illustrated by Vee Guthrie.
- Beyer, E. (1962). The Story of Little Big. The Reilly & Lee Co.
- Beyer, E. (1967). The Story of Lengthwise. Follett Publishing Co. ISBN 0-695-48360-9
