= Claire Van Vliet =

Canadian born American artist

- Born: 1933 (age 92–93); Ottawa, Ontario
- Education: B.A., San Diego State College (1952), M.F.A., Claremont Graduate School (1954)
- Occupations: Artist, illustrator, typographer

Claire Van Vliet (born 1933 in Ottawa, Ontario) is an artist, illustrator, printmaker, and typographer who founded Janus Press in San Diego, California in 1955. She received a MacArthur Genius Grant in 1989. She is known for her innovative use of dyed paper pulp to create illustrations. She is also known for her long career in artist's books. She was teaching at the museum school in Philadelphia in 1961

== Biography ==
Born in Canada, Van Vliet emigrated to the United States after the death of her parents. She arrived in California where she was raised by her aunt. Van Vliet graduated from San Diego High School in 1949, in 1952 she graduated from San Diego State College with a Bachelor of Arts, and in 1954 from Claremont Graduate School with a Master of Fine Arts. In 1955, she moved to Europe, shortly after her first publications, then returned to the United States in 1957. She worked for John Anderson of Lanston Monotype Company in Philadelphia before moving to Madison, Wisconsin. She made several trips back to Europe and continued her education in hand typesetting and compositing. She taught drawing and printmaking classes at the Philadelphia Museum School of Art and Philadelphia Museum College of Art from 1965 to 1966. In 1967, she established a typographic workshop in Madison, Wisconsin. The Janus Press has been based in Newark, Vermont since Van Vliet settled there in 1966. Van Vliet "pioneered a technique of using the colored-paper pulp to create illustrations."

== Works in collections ==
Van Vliet's work is in the collection of the Fleming Museum of Art, the National Gallery of Art, the National Museum of Women in the Arts, the Nelson-Atkins Museum of Art, the Philadelphia Museum of Art, the Smithsonian American Art Museum, and the Walker Art Center.

== Janus Press ==
The Janus Press was founded in 1955. It was named by Van Vliet for the Roman god Janus. The press publishes collaborative works by contemporary writers, papermakers, printmakers and artists, including Raymond Carver, Tess Gallagher, Seamus Heaney, Ted Hughes, W. R. Johnson, Galway Kinnell, John le Carré, Denise Levertov, Sandra McPherson, W. D. Snodgrass, Ruth Fine, Lois K. Johnson, Susan Johanknecht, Jerome Kaplan, Ray Metzker, Peter Schumann, Helen Siegl, Kathryn Clark (Twinrocker), Amanda Degener, Mary Lyn Nutting, Katie MacGregor, and Bernie Vinzani. In 2005, the 50th anniversary of the press was celebrated by an exhibition entitled Beauty in Use: 50 Years of the Janus Press at the Rauner Special Collections Library at Dartmouth College. The 60th anniversary was celebrated with an exhibition at the San Francisco Center for the Book.

== Honours ==
- 1989 – John D. and Catherine T. MacArthur Foundation Prize Fellowship
- 1995 – Elected to the National Academy of Design in New York
- 2017 – Frederic W. Goudy Award, Cary Graphic Arts Collection at the Rochester Institute of Technology

== Publications ==
- Claire Van Vliet. (1978?) Printmaker and Printer : a selection of prints and illustrated books from the Press at the Rutgers University Art Gallery in New Brunswick, New Jersey, from November 5 to December 17, 1978. [New Brunswick, N.J.] : Rutgers University Art Gallery,
- Van Vliet, Claire. (2002). Woven and interlocking book structures : from the Janus, Steiner, and Gefn presses / Newark, Vt. : Janus Gefn Unlimited.
