= Frederic W. Goudy Award =

Typography award

- Awarded for: Excellence in typography
- Sponsored by: Cary Graphic Arts Collection
- Location: Rochester Institute of Technology
- Country: United States
- First award: 1969
- Final award: 2019

The Frederic W. Goudy Award & Lecture was established in 1969 by funds donated to Rochester Institute of Technology (RIT) by the Mary Flagler Cary Charitable Trust in memory of her late husband, Melbert B. Cary, Jr., a typographer, type importer, fine printer, book collector, and president of AIGA (American Institute of Graphic Arts). The award was named after illustrious American type designer Frederic W. Goudy, a friend and business associate of Melbert Cary.

In the Preface to the book Twenty Years of the Frederic W. Goudy Award (Press of the Good Mountain, RIT 1988), Alexander Lawson, RIT Cary Professor emeritus and 1979 recipient of the Goudy Award, wrote:

"The Cary Trustees also funded an annual Frederic W. Goudy Award to be given to an outstanding practitioner in the field of typography. The person would deliver a Goudy Lecture and meet with students in class and in groups, thus providing an opportunity for informal contact with a distinguished graphic arts figure."

In the "Foreword" to the same book, Mark Guldin, then Cary Professor, former chair of the School of Printing and former Dean of the RIT College of Imaging Arts and Sciences, wrote:

"Down through the years, we have always tried to choose those designers and typophiles for the Award who have that thread of attachment to Frederic W. Goudy, those who have worked with the design of typefaces and those who have produced designs cradled in the traditional values of Gutenberg, Jenson, Aldus, Baskerville, and Bodoni. Goudy cherished those traditional values."

The Goudy Award and Lecture was given annually from 1969 to 1995. It was discontinued in 1996 when the institute diverted the funding to other purposes. It was revived in 2012, discontinued again, and revived again in 2015. Printing and typography RIT alumni and friends of the Cary Graphic Arts Collection hope it will continue annually.

== Recipients of the Goudy Award ==
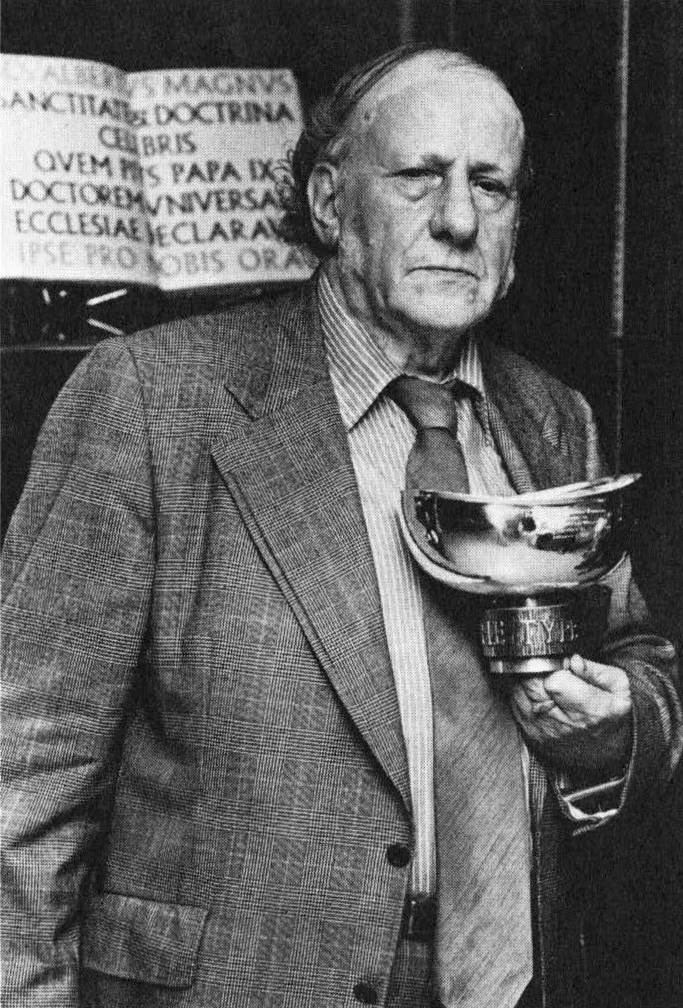
Berthold Wolpe receiving the Goudy Award in 1982

In the first years of the Goudy Award, some of the honorees had known Fred Goudy personally. Although that generation of typographers has passed on, along with much of the analog typographic technology and industry that Goudy and Cary were familiar with, many of Goudy's typefaces live on and remain popular in digital formats, while new typeface designs by several Goudy Award honorees have become popular in digital form.

Goudy Award honorees have generally been outstanding practitioners in the field of typography, including some or all of the following professions:

- Professional typographer and/or typographic designer
- Typeface designer or lettering artist
- Creator of designs and printing in the tradition Goudy cherished
- Personal and/or cultural connection to Goudy
- Educator, historian, scholar, and/or author in the fields of typography, printing, or lettering

The work of the Goudy Award honorees reveals another, implicit criterion: they elevated the artistic, scholarly, and ethical level of typography, whether through type design, like Hermann Zapf, Gudrun Zapf-Von Hesse, Adrian Frutiger, Matthew Carter, and Kris Holmes; through the art of fine printing, like Will Carter, Henry Morris, and Giovanni Mardersteig; through artistic typography and printing in commercial publishing and graphic design, like Roderick Stinehour, Bradbury Thompson, and Robert Bringhurst; through engagement in the social issues and responsibilities of typography, like Edna Beilenson and Robert (Doc) Leslie, and through typographic education and scholarship, like Alexander Lawson, John Dreyfus, Warren Chappell, and Charles Bigelow.

Goudy Award honorees have been among the most honored and admired figures in the typographic arts. Three have received MacArthur Prize Fellowships (Bigelow, Carter, and Van Vliet). Four have received the AIGA Medal (Mardersteig, Leslie, Thompson, Carter). Four have received the Mainz Gutenberg Award (Mardersteig, Zapf, Frutiger, Dreyfus). Nine have received the Type Directors Club Medal (Zapf, Middleton, Leslie, Thompson, Frutiger, Craw, Benguiat, Carter, Lange). Others have received numerous honors and awards in England, Europe, and America.

== Goudy Award honorees, dates of award, birthdates, professions ==
1. 1969 Hermann Zapf (1918–2015) (type design, calligraphy, typography, lettering art)
2. 1970 Warren Chappell (1904–1991) (book design, type design, illustration)
3. 1971 R. Hunter Middleton (1898–1985) (type design, book design)
4. 1972 Dr. Giovanni Mardersteig (1892–1977) (fine printing, type design)
5. 1973 Dr. Robert L. Leslie (1885–1987) (typography)
6. 1974 P. J. Conkwright (1905–1986) (typography, book design)
7. 1975 Will Carter (1912–2001) (fine printing, type design)
8. 1976 Rev. Edward Catich (1906–1979) (calligraphy, lettering art, scholarship)
9. 1977 Laurance Siegfried (b. 1892) (typography)
10. 1978 Howard King (b. ?) (typography)
11. 1979 Alexander S. Lawson (b. 1913) (typography, education, scholarship)
12. 1980 Edna Beilenson (1909–1981) (publishing)
13. 1981 Freeman Craw (b. 1918) (graphic design, type design)
14. 1982 Berthold Wolpe (1905–1989) (type design, lettering art)
15. 1983 Bradbury Thompson (1911–1995) (graphic design, typography)
16. 1984 John Dreyfus (b. 1918) (typography, book design, scholarship)
17. 1985 Roderick Stinehour (b. 1925) (fine printing, typography)
18. 1986 Matthew Carter (b. 1937) (type design)
19. 1987 Charles Bigelow (b. 1945) (typography, type design, education, scholarship)
20. 1988 Adrian Frutiger (1928–2015) (type design, lettering art)
21. 1989 Günter Gerhard Lange (b. 1921) (type design, lettering art)
22. 1990 Ed Benguiat (b. 1927) (type design, lettering art)
23. 1991 Gudrun Zapf von Hesse (1918–2019) (type design, calligraphy, book binding)
24. 1992 Henry Morris (b. 1925) (typography, fine printing)
25. 1993 Walter Tracy (1914–1995) (type design, typography)
26. 1995 Robert Norton (b. 1929) (typography, type design)
27. 2012 Kris Holmes (b. 1950) (type design, calligraphy, lettering art, animation)
28. 2015 Jerry Kelly (b. 1955) (calligraphy, book design, scholarship, type design)
29. 2016 Robert Bringhurst (b. 1946) (typography, book design, scholarship, poetry, First Nation literature)
30. 2017 Claire Van Vliet (b. 1933) (typography, fine arts, illustration)
31. 2018 Robert Slimbach (b. 1956) (typography, type design)
32. 2019 John Benson (b. 1939) (stone carver, type design, calligraphy)
33. 2021 Louise Fili (b. 1951) (graphic designer)
