= Valenti Angelo =

American writer

- Born: June 23, 1897; Massarosa, Italy
- Died: September 3, 1982 (aged 85); San Francisco, California, US
- Occupations: printmaker, illustrator and author
- Writing career
- Notable works: Paradise Valley; The Rooster Club; The Bells of Bleecker Street; The Marble Fountain; Nino; Salome; The Scarlet Letter
- Notable awards: Newbery Honor for Nino in 1939

Valenti Angelo (1897-1982) (variant name Valenti Michael Angelo) was an Italian-American printmaker, illustrator and author, born June 23, 1897, in Massarosa, Italy. He immigrated to the United States, living first in New York City then settling in Antioch, California. At the age of nineteen, Angelo moved to San Francisco, working by day as a labourer and spending his evenings and weekends at libraries and museums. He soon became a versatile artist and an especially skilled engraver and printer. Angelo's favoured medium was the linocut, and his prints depicting urban nocturnes and desert scenes of the American Southwest are particularly coveted by collectors and dealers. In 1926, Angelo made his first book illustrations for the well-known, San Francisco-based Grabhorn Press.

In a period of 34 years, Angelo decorated and illustrated roughly 250 books. Among these were folio editions of Walt Whitman's Leaves of Grass, The Travels of Sir John Mandeville, and numerous books of the Bible. Many of these books have been included in the annual American Institute of Graphic Arts exhibitions since 1927. Under the tutelage of May Massee of Viking Press, Angelo began writing children's stories in 1937. In 1939, Angelo won the Newbery Honor for Nino. After a mid-life relocation to New York state, he returned to San Francisco in 1974 and continued his life's work. Angelo died in San Francisco on September 3, 1982.

== Selected collections ==
- Library of Congress, Washington D.C.
- New York Public Library
- Special Collections, Stony Brook University Libraries

== Selected publications ==
- Paradise Valley
- The Rooster Club
- The Candy Basket 1960 The Viking Press
- The Bells of Bleecker Street
- The Marble Fountain
- Nino
- Salome
- The Scarlet Letter
- 1934 Limited Editions Club edition: Burton, Richard Francis, translator, The Book of the Thousand Nights and a Night: The Complete Burton Translation with the Complete Burton Notes, the Terminal Index, and 1001 Decorations by Valenti Angelo, 3 Volumes (reprinted in 1962).
- The Little Flowers of Saint Francis of Assisi, The translation of Thomas Okey, Published by Peter Pauper Press (c. 1944)
