= ChloroFilms =

Plant biology film contest, 2008 to 2010

ChloroFilms was an international amateur plant biology film contest held four times between 2008 and 2010. The contest was created by Daniel Cosgrove at Pennsylvania State University with the goal of promoting independent videos that could both educate the audience about plant biology and capture their attention. It was funded by the American Society of Plant Biologists, the Botanical Society of America and the Canadian Botanical Association, and awarded over $13,000 in cash prizes in 2009 and 2010.

== Winners ==
In the first contest, a grand prize of $1000 was awarded to "Fertile Eyes," a collaboration between Ela Lamblin and Anna Edlund which informed viewers about pollination and plant fertilization via the medium of song and dance. Runners up, each awarded $500, included "Fantastic Vesicle Traffic" by Daniel von Wangenheim, "La Bloomba" by Kris Holmes, "PSI — Are My Soybeans Wearing Different Genes?" by Burkhard Schulz, and "The Carnivorous Syndrome in 3D" by Mike Wilder.

The second contest's grand prize winner was "Kenaf Callus Hoedown" by Noah Flanigan, a stop motion video that illustrates the process of cultivating plant tissue and features "lively and quirky music." The third contest's grand prize winner was "Arabidopsis Flower in 3D "by David Livingston, a technical video showing a 3D reconstruction of the internal anatomy of flowers The fourth contest had a two-way tie for grand prize, awarded to "All Things Algae" by Terry Woodford–Thomas and "Seed Imbibition" by Robert Lewis Gerten.
