= Marjorie Barrows =

American woman magazine editor, book compiler, and author

Marjorie Barrows (1892 – 1983) was an American magazine editor, book compiler, and author.

Barrows was an editor of Child Life and Family Weekly, as well as a book reviewer for The Continent. A 1932 article from the Spring Lake Gazette stated that Barrows was "a famous editor of Child Life Magazine and that she was an "internationally recognized editor" of the same magazine. An article from School Life reported in 1933 that she "has the endorsement of leading children's librarians".

A 1932 review in the Standard-Examiner reported that The Picture Book of Poetry, which was compiled by Barrows, has "gems of verses by writers who understand boys and girls". The Denton Record-Chronicle reviewed The Family Reader in 1961, stating, The Family Reader is a book for your lighter moments, for the times you want to relax and lose yourself in a good story".

== Bibliography ==
- 1000 Beautiful Things
- The American Experience
- A Book Of Famous Poems
- A Book Of Famous Poems For Older Boys And Girls
- The Children's Hour
- The Children's Treasury
- Currents In Drama
- Ezra the Elephant
- The Family Reader
- Fraidy Cat (1942)
- The Frances Tipton Hunter Picture Book
- The Funny Hat (1943)
- Hoppity
- Jojo (1944)
- Lancelot
- Let's Fly to Bermuda (1942)
- Look! A Parade
- Muggins Mouse
- Muggins Takes Off
- Muggins' Big Balloon
- Muggins Becomes A Hero
- One Hundred Best Poems For Boys And Girls
- One Thousand Beautiful Things
- The Peoples Reader
- Pet Show
- Pudgy the Little Bear (1948)
- Pulitzer Prize Poems
- The Quintessence Of Beauty And Romance
- Scamper (1949)
- Science Fiction & Readers Guide
- Snuggles
- Sukey, You Shall Be My Wife And Other Stories
- Timothy Tiger (1943)
- Treasures Of Love Inspiration
- A Treasury Of Humor And Toastmaster's Handbook
- Waggles (1945)
- Whiskers (1937)
