= P. J. Conkwright =

American graphic designer and typographer

Pleasant Jefferson Conkwright (October 23, 1905 – January 31, 1986) was an American graphic designer and typographer for the Princeton University Press.

== Early life and education ==
P.J. Conkwright was born on October 23, 1905, in the Oklahoma Territory to a missionary family. He was introduced to printing through his father in the creation of the church bulletin and a Boy Scout troop newspaper. In 1924, Conkwright enrolled at Oklahoma Baptist University transferring to the University of Oklahoma, the University of Missouri and landing at the University of Kentucky where he received his BA in history.

In 1929, he joined the staff at the University of Oklahoma Press where he also received his MA in English and history with an emphasis on American printing history, which was also his thesis. In 1934, he married Hazel Dale Boone.

== Career ==
In 1939, he became the art director for the Princeton University Press and later taught design at Princeton University until his retirement in 1970. At Princeton, he brought innovative and modern design to the conservative academic audience of university books and transformed the university into a center for innovative design. Conkwright's design philosophy was that the book's design should be user-friendly for the reader: lie flat when opened; wide margins to allow for holding; stamped spine; and clear, readable type. He also chose carefully the materials to be the best possible and within budget. Many of the designers he hired also received recognition, including: Helen van Zandt, Jan Lilly, and Frank Manhood.

From 1942 to 1976, he had 52 books selected for AIGA's “Fifty Books of the Year” contest. Among the most memorable work was the multivolume Jefferson Papers, where he designed the Linotype face, Monticello, for the volumes.

In 1955, he received the AIGA Gold Medal in recognition of his work. In September 1956, he received a Guggenheim fellowship to study design and typography in Europe. In 1974, the received the Goudy Award.

He died on January 31, 1986.
