= Ismar David =

Calligrapher and graphic designer (1910–1996)

- Born: August 27, 1910; Breslau (Wrocław), German Empire
- Died: February 26, 1996 (aged 85); New York City, U.S.
- Occupations: Calligrapher, graphic designer, type designer
- Known for: Designed David Hebrew typeface

Ismar David (27 August 1910 – 26 February 1996) was a calligrapher, graphic designer, type designer architectural designer, illustrator and educator.

Ismar David was born on 27 August 1910, in Breslau (Wrocław), then part of the German Empire, to Rosa and Wolff David. He was apprenticed to a house painter in Breslau from 1925 to 1928, when he went to Berlin. There, he went to art school at Städtische Kunstgewerbe- und Handwerkerschule in Charlottenburg.

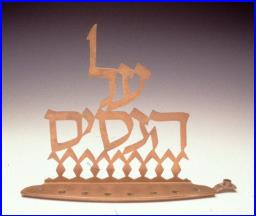
A Hanukkah lamp designed by Ismar David combines a series of pointed arches, familiar from traditional medieval Hanukkah lamps, with clean contemporary lines.

He left school in 1932 and moved to Jerusalem, then under the Mandate for Palestine, where he worked with the Jewish National Fund to design golden books—works in which the fund's donors were profiled. While in Jerusalem, David began to design a typeface family for the Hebrew script called David Hebrew.

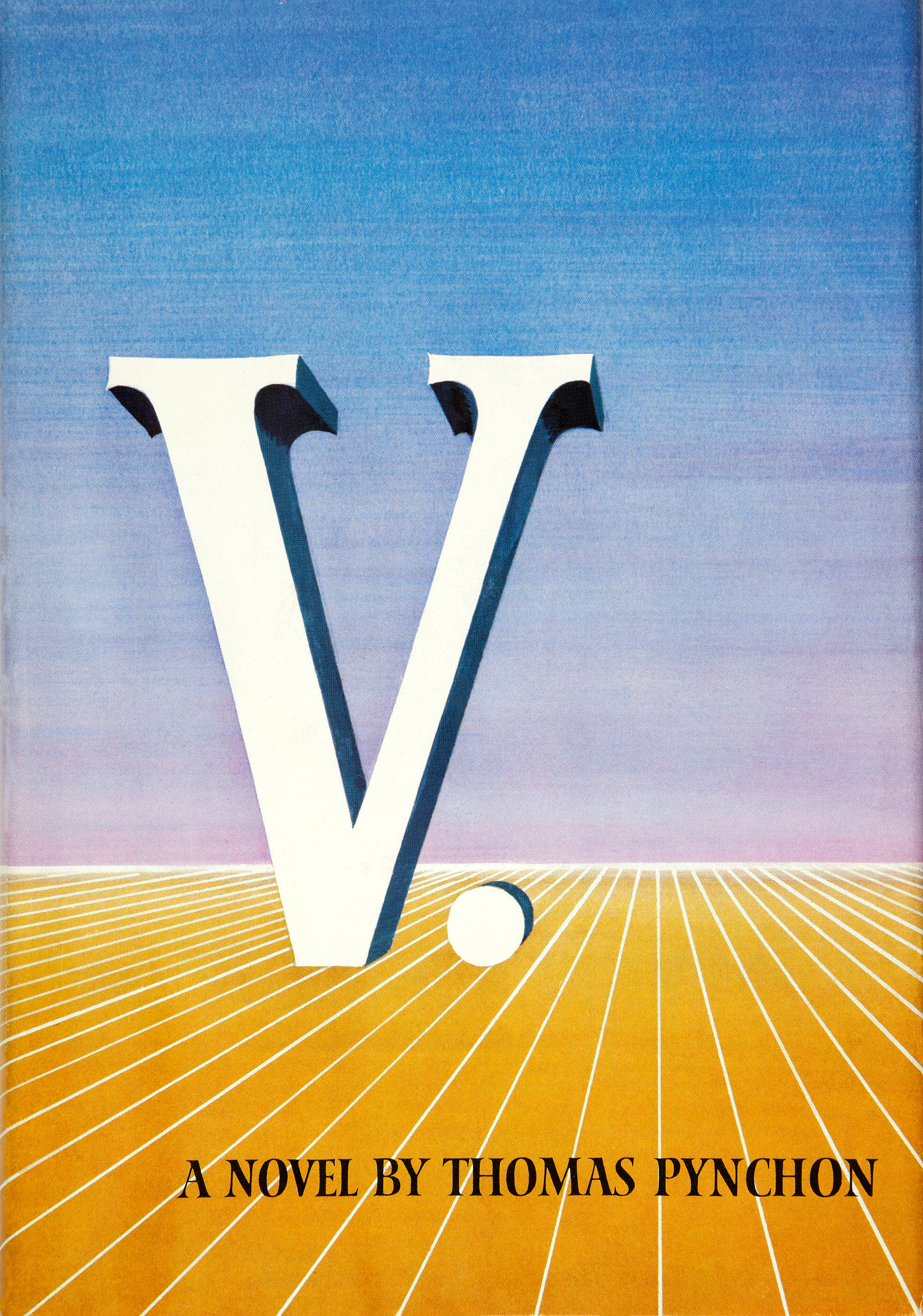
Cover design from the first-edition dust jacket of the 1963 novel V. by Thomas Pynchon, designed by Ismar David

David settled permanently in New York City in 1953. David's art often accompanied religious texts.

He died on 26 February 1996 in New York City.

== Ismar David Archive ==
The Cary Graphic Arts Collection, a rare book library on the history of graphic communication, holds the Ismar David Papers. The collection contains correspondence, personal papers, photographs, writings, artwork, and publications that document David's life and career.

== Publications ==
- The Hebrew Letter: Calligraphic Variations (1990)

== Works cited ==
- Avni, Shani (2019). "Ismar David's Quest for Original Hebrew Typographic Signs". Visible Language. 53 (1). doi:10.34314/vl.v53i1.4623. ISSN 2691-5529.
- Brandshaft, Helen; Pankow, David, eds. (2005). The Work of Ismar David. RIT Cary Graphic Arts Press. ISBN 978-0-9759651-2-2.
