= Child Life (magazine) =

Children's magazine

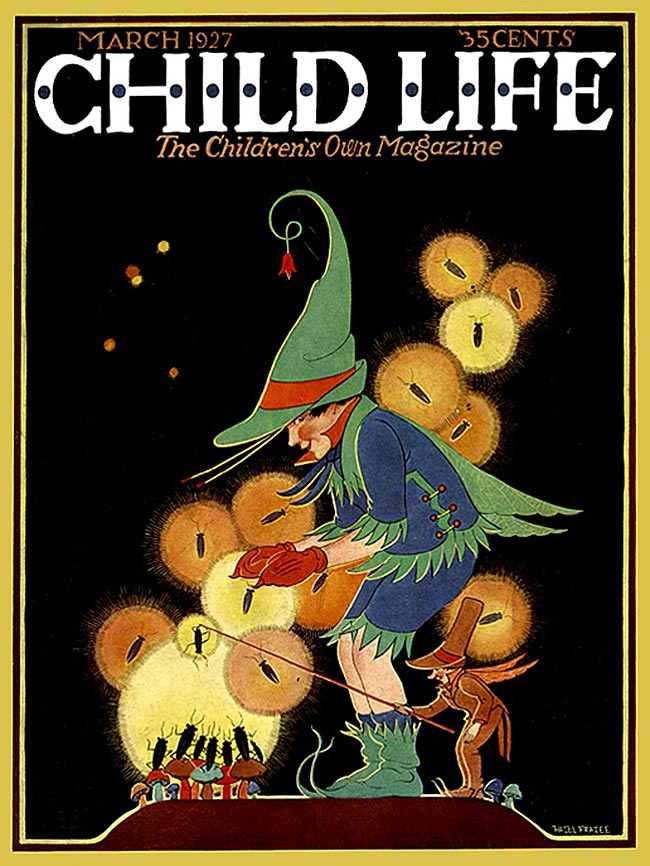
- March 1927 cover by Hazel Frazee
- Frequency: monthly until 1950, then 10, and later 8 issues per year
- Circulation: 250,000
- Publisher: Rand McNally (1922-Nov 1941); Child Life, Inc. (Dec 1941-Nov 1966); Review Publishing Co. (Dec 1966-Jun 1973); Curtis Publishing Company (Aug 1973-Dec 1979); Benjamin Franklin Literary and Medical Society (1980–2007)
- First issue: 1922; 104 years ago
- Final issue: 2007
- Country: United States
- Language: English

Child Life was a United States children's magazine founded in December 1921, when Rand McNally produced a specimen issue, before beginning regular publication in 1922. It published poems and stories by Marjorie Barrows, Margaret Widdemer, Carl Sandburg, Augusta Huiell Seaman, Padraic Colum, Nora Archibald and Dr. Seuss.

For most of its history Child Life had the subtitle of The Children's Own Magazine, but for a time, starting in 1976, the subtitle became Mystery and Science-Fiction Magazine. The magazine ceased publication in 2007.

== Content by publisher ==
=== Rand McNally (January 1922 – November 1941) ===
Rand McNally produced a specimen issue of Child Life: The Children's Own Magazine dated December 1921, before beginning regular publication in 1922. It was a 64-page monthly magazine, well illustrated, and printed on coated paper. The cost was 25 cents an issue.

The first editor, Rose Waldo, selected material for children ages 5 through 15, and most of the content was written by women. Waldo organized sections under numerous headings. "Nursery Nuggets" had short poems and stories for very young readers. "Happiness Hall" was for older children, and had longer stories and poems.

From 1922 to 1938 Child Life's art editor Ruby McKim published quilt patterns and needlework projects for children.

The "Joy Givers Club" was open to readers under the age of 12 to submit their own drawings for possible publication. In 1932 a music appreciation contest was started, under the direction of Anne Faulkner Oberndorfer, who also wrote articles on music composition for the magazine.

=== Child Life, Inc. (December 1941 – November 1966) ===
Child Life, Inc. was a company organized by Clayton Holt Ernst. The magazine's page count was reduced to 48, and its content was presented under three headings: "Stories, Poems, and Plays", "For You To Do", and "Keeping Up With Child Life".

Dr. Seuss's first holiday piece, "Perfect Present" was published in the December 1953 issue.

A column entitled "The Hollow Tree" printed readers' poems and letters about trips they would like to take. Starting in 1947 many articles about travel were published.

In 1949 the magazine reduced its issues to ten per year by combining the June / July and the August / September issues. In 1960 Child Life had a circulation of 200,000.

=== Review Publishing Co. (December 1966 – June / July 1973) ===
Review Publishing geared its content towards children aged 7 to 11 years old. They published stories and riddles, and had a column for children seeking pen pals.

Simple recipes, such as sandwiches and no-bake cookies, were published for children to make for themselves. Readers could enter poetry contests, and winning poems were published in the magazine.

=== Curtis Publishing Company (August / September 1973 – December 1979) ===
The Curtis Publishing Company owned The Saturday Evening Post, and was later renamed The Saturday Evening Post Company. In April 1974 Child Life became a digest-sized periodical with 64 pages. In October 1976 the subtitle became Mystery and Science Fiction Magazine. The content included fiction, articles, jokes, riddles, and hidden pictures.

The magazine continued to be geared for ages 7 to 11, and much of the content was supplied by its readers. Children submitted poems, as well as stories and articles that did not exceed 500 words. A feature entitled "Art Gallery" printed pictures drawn by readers.

=== Benjamin Franklin Literary and Medical Society (January 1980 – July / August 2007) ===
In 1980 the magazine was purchased by the Benjamin Franklin Literary and Medical Society and was published by its division, the Children's Better Health Institute.

The periodical was aimed at children from 7 to 9 years old, emphasized health and good reading, and published 8 issues per year.

Regular features included "The Poet’s Page", "Jokes, Riddles and Cartoons", and "Ask Doctor Cory", a column for children to ask medical questions that were answered by Dr. Cory SerVaas. "Young Writer's Story" printed original stories from readers on the topics of health, safety, nutrition, and exercise.

In 1981 Child Life had a circulation of 103,000, and the subscription price was $10.95 a year.

== Beurt SerVaas' connections to three publishers ==
In 1960 Bert R. SerVaas purchased Child Life, and he later founded Review Publishing to publish the magazine, along with several other periodicals.

In 1970 SerVaas became the president and controlling stockholder of Curtis Publishing Company, which published The Saturday Evening Post. Curtis Publishing Company began printing Child Life in 1973.

In 1976 SerVaas and his wife Dr. Cory SerVaas founded the Benjamin Franklin Literary and Medical Society, and its division Children's Better Health Institute, and in 1980 the society began publishing Child Life. In 1982 the society purchased The Saturday Evening Post.

== Merger with Children's Digest ==
The July / August 2007 issue of Child Life contained a notice stating that, starting with the September / October 2007 issue the magazine would be merged with Children's Digest. Readers were assured that popular features would continue to be published.
