= Lucida Grande =

Humanist sans-serif typeface

- Category: Sans-serif
- Classification: Humanist
- Designers: Charles Bigelow; Kris Holmes
- Foundry: Bigelow & Holmes
- Date released: Avril 30, 2015

Lucida Grande is a humanist sans-serif typeface. It is a member of the Lucida family of typefaces designed by Charles Bigelow and Kris Holmes. It is best known for its implementation throughout the macOS user interface from 2000 to 2014, as well as in other Apple software like Safari for Windows. As of OS X Yosemite (version 10.10), the system font was changed from Lucida Grande to Helvetica Neue. In OS X El Capitan (version 10.11) the system font changed again, this time to San Francisco.

The typeface looks very similar to Lucida Sans and Lucida Sans Unicode. Like Sans Unicode, Grande supports the most commonly used characters defined in version 2.0 of the Unicode standard.

Three weights of Lucida Grande: Normal, Bold, and Black, in three styles: Roman, Italic, and Oblique, were developed by Bigelow & Holmes. Apple released the Regular (Normal Roman) and Bold Roman with OS X.

In June, 2014, Bigelow & Holmes released four weights: Light, Normal, Bold, and Black, in three styles: Roman, Italic, and Oblique. B&H also released Narrow versions of those twelve weight/styles, plus four Lucida Grande Monospaced fonts in Regular, Bold, Italic, and Bold Italic styles, with narrow versions of the four monospaced weight/styles.

Lucida Grande fonts directly from Bigelow & Holmes contain the pan-European WGL character set.

== Scripts and Unicode ranges ==
Lucida Grande contains 2,826 Unicode-encoded glyphs (2,245 characters) in version 5.0d8e1 (Revision 1.002).

Language support by version:

	3.7d8	5.0d8e1 revision 1.002	6.0d10e1 revision 6.004 (OSX 10.5)	6.1d4e1 (OSX 10.6)
Afrikaans	No	Yes	Yes	Yes
Albanian	Yes	Yes	Yes	Yes
Azerbaijani	No	Yes	Yes	Yes
Basque	Yes	Yes	Yes	Yes
Belarusian	Yes	Yes	Yes	Yes
Bulgarian	Yes	Yes	Yes	Yes
Catalan	Yes	Yes	Yes	Yes
Cornish	Yes	Yes	Yes	Yes
Croatian	Yes	Yes	Yes	Yes
Czech	Yes	Yes	Yes	Yes
Danish	Yes	Yes	Yes	Yes
Dutch	Yes	Yes	Yes	Yes
English	Yes	Yes	Yes	Yes
Esperanto	No	Yes	Yes	Yes
Estonian	Yes	Yes	Yes	Yes
Faroese	Yes	Yes	Yes	Yes
Finnish	Yes	Yes	Yes	Yes
French	Yes	Yes	Yes	Yes
Galician	Yes	Yes	Yes	Yes
German	Yes	Yes	Yes	Yes
Greek	Yes	Yes	Yes	Yes
Hausa	No	Yes	Yes	No
Hawaiian	No	Yes	Yes	Yes
Hebrew	No	Yes	Yes	Yes
Hungarian	Yes	Yes	Yes	Yes
Icelandic	Yes	Yes	Yes	Yes
Indonesian	Yes	Yes	Yes	Yes
Irish	Yes	Yes	Yes	Yes
Italian	Yes	Yes	Yes	Yes
Kalaallisut	No	Yes	Yes	Yes
Kazakh	No	Yes	Yes	Yes
Latvian	Yes	Yes	Yes	Yes
Lithuanian	Yes	Yes	Yes	Yes
Macedonian	Yes	Yes	Yes	Yes
Malay	Yes	Yes	Yes	Yes
Maltese	Yes	Yes	Yes	Yes
Manx	Yes	Yes	Yes	Yes
Norwegian Bokmål	Yes	Yes	Yes	Yes
Norwegian Nynorsk	Yes	Yes	Yes	Yes
Oromo	Yes	Yes	Yes	Yes
Polish	Yes	Yes	Yes	Yes
Portuguese	Yes	Yes	Yes	Yes
Romanian	Yes	Yes	Yes	Yes
Russian	Yes	Yes	Yes	Yes
Serbian	Yes	Yes	Yes	Yes
Slovak	Yes	Yes	Yes	Yes
Slovenian	Yes	Yes	Yes	Yes
Somali	Yes	Yes	Yes	Yes
Spanish	Yes	Yes	Yes	Yes
Swahili	Yes	Yes	Yes	Yes
Swedish	Yes	Yes	Yes	Yes
Thai	No	Yes	Yes	No
Turkish	Yes	Yes	Yes	Yes
Ukrainian	No	Yes	Yes	Yes
Uzbek	No	Yes	Yes	Yes
Vietnamese	Yes	Yes	Yes	Yes
Welsh	No	Yes	Yes	Yes

== Similarity to Lucida Sans/Lucida Sans Unicode ==
Almost all glyphs in Lucida Grande (and Lucida Grande Bold) look identical to their matching counterparts in Lucida Sans (and Lucida Sans Demibold) as well as Lucida Sans Unicode, with the very few exceptions of:

- The digit "1" with a serif on the baseline;
- The hyphen "-" that is longer, roughly of an en-dash width;
- The commercial at "@" with a larger and more upright letter and circle.

These slightly different characters look clearer in small font sizes in display and user interface (especially graphical and web-based) uses.

Note: If you have installed Lucida Grande font on Windows or Linux you will see followings above.

== Uses ==
Apart from macOS releases prior to OS X Yosemite, many websites and blogs use Lucida Grande as the default typeface for body text, for example Facebook, Archive of Our Own and many phpBB forums. Since this typeface is usually absent from most other operating systems like Windows and Linux, the CSS style sheets of these websites often include the fonts (usually Sans-serif): Tahoma, Verdana, Trebuchet MS, Segoe UI, Calibri, DejaVu Sans, Arial, Open Sans, or even Lucida Sans Unicode, in case Lucida Grande is unavailable for rendering. After the introduction of OS X Yosemite where Lucida Grande is no longer used as the default system font, several developers have created utilities to bring Lucida Grande back as the default system font.

Although it was designed primarily as a screen font, Lucida Grande/Sans also appears frequently in print, due at least in part to the ubiquity of Mac platform (and thus the typeface) in professional-grade desktop publishing. The Getty-Dubay Italic Handwriting Series of penmanship workbooks in particular is typeset primarily in a specially modified version of Lucida Sans (with a cursive lowercase "y"), as its monoline italic bears a close resemblance to the form of writing that the program teaches.

== See also ==
- Lucida Sans Unicode
- List of typefaces included with macOS
- Unicode fonts
- Sans-serif
