= Nino (novel) =

1938 children's novel by Valenti Angelo

- Author: Valenti Angelo
- Illustrator: Valenti Angelo
- Language: English
- Genre: Children's literature
- Publisher: Viking
- Publication date: 1938
- Publication place: United States
- Pages: 244

Nino is a 1938 children's novel written and illustrated by Valenti Angelo. Inspired by Angelo's childhood, it tells the story of Nino, a young boy who lives in the Italian village of Massarosa with his mother and grandfather. Nino's father migrated to America when Nino was a baby and keeps in contact with the family via letter. After a series of adventures with his grandfather and best friend, Julio, a letter arrives from Nino's father containing money for the family to come to America and start a new life.

It was a Newbery Honor recipient in 1939. Anne T. Eaton reviewed the book in the New York Times and called special attention to the quality of the typography and illustrations.
