= Beurt SerVaas =

American businessman, publisher, and politician

- Born: May 7, 1919; Indianapolis, Indiana, U.S.
- Died: February 2, 2014 (aged 94)
- Education: Shortridge High School
- Alma mater: Indiana University Bloomington
- Occupations: Businessman, publisher, and politician
- Spouse: Cory Synhorst SerVaas
- Children: 5

Dr. Beurt Richard SerVaas (May 7, 1919 – February 2, 2014) was an American businessman, publisher, and politician. He served as a US Naval Officer in China during World War II, after being recruited by the Office of Strategic Services (OSS, now known as the CIA). He later served on the Indianapolis City-County Council from 1961 to 2002, the last 27 years of which as the council president.

== Early life ==
SerVaas was born on May 7, 1919, in Indianapolis, Indiana, to Beurt Hans and Lela Etta SerVaas. He graduated from Shortridge High School in 1937. At the age of 15, he achieved the rank of Eagle Scout and was named "one of Indiana's most distinguished scouts of the past 100 years." During his study at Indiana University Bloomington, he took a janitorial job at the Indianapolis IU Extension Division. In order to obtain a job in Argentina he needed to learn Spanish, so he enrolled at the University of Mexico, having been loaned $35 from his grandfather for his trip and then hitchhiking to Mexico. In 1939 he returned home to finish his study at IU and graduated in May 1941 with a degree in chemistry, history, and Spanish. While at Indiana University, he joined Delta Upsilon fraternity. After his graduation, he worked at Shortridge High School where he taught chemistry and Spanish. At the same time he attended classes at the Purdue University as a DuPont scholar to complete post-graduate work in chemistry. He earned a Doctorate of Medical Science from the Indiana University School of Medicine in 1970.

SerVaas served in the China theatre in World War II as a naval officer. Together with 15 men in his command he was to "disrupt Japanese river supply lines, train Chinese troops and establish intelligence resources prepared for the invasion of the Japanese mainland." He was awarded the Bronze Star Medal for fulfilling the special assignment at the Japanese garrison on Formosa (Taiwan). Ten years after the end of World War II, SerVaas was invited to Taiwan to receive the Chiang Kai-shek Medal of Honor.

== Career ==
SerVaas worked for the Central Intelligence Agency. His business career started in 1949 when he bought a struggling electric plating company for $5,600, the sum he saved during his military service. In the following years he bought about 50 other businesses in Indianapolis and around the world. His business activity was spread across engine rebuilders, rubber refiners, and makers of cleaning products, including the brand Bar Keepers Friend. He was the owner of The Saturday Evening Post which he bought and moved to Indianapolis. SerVaas built the first color TV manufacturing plant in Poland before the fall of Berlin Wall.

SerVaas won election to the Indianapolis City Council in the early 1960s. SerVaas served as chairman of the Governor's Indiana State Commission on Medical Education. He also held a post of chairman of the original State Commission for Higher Education. He was one of the founders of the National Institute for Fitness and Sport.

SerVaas served as a founding member of the board of The Citizen, a South African newspaper founded in 1975.

SerVaas was also instrumental in helping African American-owned newspapers and TV stations in Indianapolis.

SerVaas retired from the council in 2002.

== Personal life and death ==
SerVaas married Cory Synhorst on February 4, 1950. They had five children (Eric, Joan, Paul, Kristin and Amy), 22 grandchildren and two great-granddaughters.

SerVaas died at the age of 94.
