= Robert L. Leslie =

Robert Lincoln Leslie (December 18, 1885 – April 1, 1987) was an American medical doctor, graphic designer, and typologist.

== Early life and career ==
Robert Leslie was born on December 18, 1885, in New York City’s Lower East Side to Louis Leslie, a Scottish seaman who converted to Judaism and married a Jewish immigrant from Lithuania. He entered the workforce at 14, working for a Russian intellectual and printer where he learned to love typography, printing, and to speak fluent Russian. In 1900, he enrolled at the City College of New York, where he received his undergraduate degree in 1904. He went on to attend Johns Hopkins University, where he received his M.D. in 1912. In addition to his scholarship, he worked for the printing office of Theodore Low DeVinne to pay for tuition. His first job was working for the United States Public Health Service where he redesigned government publications in Maryland. He also became an expert on bubonic plague through volunteer service at Ellis Island.

In 1918, he married Dr. Sarah Greenberg, a gynecologist, obstetrician, and the first woman in New York City to be licensed by the American Board of Obstetrics and Gynecology.

== Career ==
The couple moved back to New York in 1920, where Leslie was employed by the McGraw Hill Company as the first industrial doctor in the city. At McGraw Hill, he met Sol Cantor, a printer for the Carey Printing Company. The men became business partners, forming The Composing Room, Inc. in 1927. The Composing Room employed advanced type-setting methods that boasted quick turnarounds and high-quality work for high-circulation magazines including Vogue, Vanity Fair, and House and Garden. The Composing Room worked directly with font foundries like Linotype and encouraged ligatures to be created for bad letter combinations. It was the first typography house to be able to produce a range of font sizes (5-144pt) at all times; a proofing press for transparencies; and the first to install the All-Purpose-Linotype (APL) machines.

In 1934, the type shop created their own magazine, called PM (later A-D magazine) with co-editor Percy Seitlin for art directors and production people. The magazine was a bi-monthly promotional publication produced between 1934 and 1942. It expressed Leslie’s desire to identify and explore new approaches in graphic arts while creating a market for good machine typesetting. The magazine gave young designers a platform for their experiments and helped to launch and expand the careers of many by making design accessible to businesses. It was suspended in 1942 in light of World War II and was never resumed.

In 1936, Leslie worked with Hortense Mendel to create Gallery 303. It was intended to showcase new American artists and emigres from Europe who were fleeing Nazi Germany. And in 1965, began a lecture series through the gallery, called the Heritage of Graphic Arts. He also set up a graphic arts salon that leaders of the industry including Ladislav Sutnar, Alvin Lustig and Herbert Bayer could discuss design and talk shop.

In the 1950s, he was instrumental in the creation of the High School of Industrial Arts (later renamed the High School of Art and Design) in New York City. He also founded a paper mill and artist colony in Beer Sheva, Israel, in the old Turkish railway station.

in 1969, Leslie retired for the Composing Room and AIGA awarded him the AIGA medal. Later that year, he became president of Typophiles, an organization of book lovers. In 1972, he was awarded the Type Directors Club Medal. In 1973, he received the Goudy award from RIT.

Robert Leslie died on April 1, 1987, in Brooklyn at 101 years of age.
