= Lucida =

Typeface family

- Category: Sans-serif, serif, and more
- Designers: Charles Bigelow and Kris Holmes
- Date released: 1984
- License: Commercial

Lucida (pronunciation: /ˈluːsɪdə/) is an extended family of related typefaces designed by Charles Bigelow and Kris Holmes and released from 1984 onwards. The family is intended to be extremely legible when printed at small size or displayed on a low-resolution display – hence the name, from 'lucid' (clear or easy to understand).

There are many variants of Lucida, including serif (Fax, Bright), sans-serif (Sans, Sans Unicode, Grande, Sans Typewriter) and scripts (Blackletter, Calligraphy, Handwriting). Many are released with other software, most notably Microsoft Office.

Bigelow and Holmes, together with the (now defunct) TeX vendor Y&Y, extended the Lucida family with a full set of TeX mathematical symbols, making it one of the few typefaces that provide full-featured text and mathematical typesetting within TeX. Lucida is still licensed commercially through the TUG store as well through their own web store. The fonts are occasionally updated.

== Key features ==
The Lucida fonts have a large x-height (tall lower-case letters), open apertures and quite widely spaced letters, classic features of fonts designed for legibility in body text. Capital letters were designed to be somewhat narrow and short in order to make all-caps acronyms blend in. Bigelow has said in interview that the characters were designed based on hand-drawn bitmaps to see what parts of letters needed to be clear in bitmap, before creating outlines that would render as clear bitmaps. The fonts include ligatures, but these are not needed for text, allowing use on simplistic typesetting systems. x-heights are consistent between the fonts. Hinting was used to allow onscreen display.

== Lucida Serif ==
Lucida Serif

The original Lucida font designed in 1985, featuring a thickened serif. It was simply called Lucida when it was first released.

=== Lucida Bright ===
Lucida Bright

Based on Lucida Serif, it features more contrasted strokes and serifs.

The font was first used as the text face for Scientific American magazine, and its letter-spacing was tightened to give it a slightly closer fit for use in two and three column formats.

=== Lucida Fax ===
Lucida Fax

A slab serif font family released in 1992. Derived from Lucida, and specifically designed for telefaxing.

=== Lucida Typewriter Serif ===
Lucida Typewriter Serif

Also called Lucida Typewriter, this font is a slab serif monospaced version of Lucida Fax, but with wider serifs. The letters are wider than Lucida Sans Typewriter.

== Lucida Sans ==
Lucida Sans

A family of humanist sans-serif fonts complementing Lucida Serif. The italic is a "true italic" rather than a "sloped roman", inspired by chancery cursive handwriting of the Italian renaissance, which Bigelow and Holmes studied while at Reed College in the 1960s.

=== Lucida Grande ===
Lucida Grande

A version of Lucida Sans with expanded character sets, released around 2000. It supports Latin, Greek, Cyrillic, Arabic, Hebrew, Thai scripts. It is most notable for having been used as the system font for macOS (then Mac OS X) until version 10.10.

=== Lucida Sans Unicode ===
Lucida Sans Unicode

Based on Lucida Sans Regular, this version added characters in Arrows, Block Elements, Box Drawing, Combining Diacritical Marks, Control Pictures, Currency Symbols, Cyrillic, General Punctuation, Geometric Shapes, Greek and Coptic, Hebrew, IPA Extensions, Latin Extended-A, Latin Extended-B, Letterlike Symbols, Mathematical Operators, Miscellaneous Symbols, Miscellaneous Technical, Spacing Modifier Letters, Superscripts and Subscripts regions.

=== Lucida Sans Typewriter ===
Lucida Sans Typewriter

Also called Lucida Typewriter Sans, this is a sans-serif monospaced font family, designed for typewriters. Its styling is reminiscent of Letter Gothic and Andalé Mono; a variant, Lucida Console (see below), replaced those two fonts on Microsoft Windows systems.

=== Lucida Console ===
Lucida Console

A monospaced font that is a variant of Lucida Sans Typewriter, with smaller line spacing and the addition of the WGL4 character set. In 2014, Bigelow & Holmes released bold weights and italics in normal and narrow widths. Lucida Console was the default font in Microsoft Notepad from Windows 2000 through Windows 7, its replacement being Consolas. This was also the font for the blue screen of death from Windows XP to Windows 7.

== Lucida Arrows ==
A family of fonts containing arrows.

== Lucida Blackletter ==
Lucida Blackletter

A family of cursive blackletter fonts released in 1992.

== Lucida Calligraphy ==
Lucida Calligraphy

A script font developed from Chancery cursive, released in 1991.

== Lucida Casual ==
A casual font, released in 1994. Similar to Lucida Handwriting, but without connecting strokes. In 2014, Bigelow & Holmes released additional weights in normal and narrow widths.

== Lucida Handwriting ==
Lucida Handwriting

A font, released in 1992, designed to resemble informal cursive handwriting with modern plastic-tipped or felt-tipped pens or markers. In 2014, Bigelow & Holmes added additional weights and widths to the family.

== Lucida Icons ==
A family of fonts for ornament and decoration uses. It contains ampersands, interrobangs, asterisms, circled Lucida Sans numerals, etc.

== Lucida Math ==
A family of fonts for mathematical expressions. Lucida Math Extension contains only mathematical symbols. Lucida Math Italic contains Latin characters from Lucida Serif Italic, but with smaller line spacing, and added Greek letters. Lucida Math contains mathematical symbols, and blackletter (from Lucida Blackletter) and script letters (from Lucida Calligraphy Italic) in the Letterlike Symbols region.

== Lucida OpenType ==
First released in March 2012, this collection includes OpenType math fonts in regular and bold weights, and Lucida Bright, Lucida Sans Typewriter, and Lucida Sans text fonts in the usual four variants (regular, italic, bold, bold italic). The regular math font includes an entirely new math script alphabet in Roundhand style, among other new characters. The Lucida Bright text fonts include Unicode Latin character blocks including Basic Latin, Latin-1, and Latin Extended-A characters for American, Western European, Central European, Turkish, and other Latin-based orthographies.

== Usages ==
Lucida Console is used in various parts of Microsoft Windows. From Windows 2000 until Windows 7, Lucida Console is used as the default typeface of Notepad. In Windows XP until Windows 7, and in Windows CE, Lucida Console is used as the typeface of the Blue Screen of Death. Lucida Grande, as well as Lucida Sans Demibold (identical outlines to Lucida Grande Bold but with tighter spacing of numerals), were used as the primary user interface font in Apple Inc.'s Mac OS X operating system until OS X Yosemite, as well as many programs including Front Row. Lucida is also used in the logo for Air Canada. A collection of Lucida variants are included in the Oracle JRE 9. Lucida Calligraphy was used in the logo for Gladden Entertainment.

In April 2012, Lucida Sans was selected by GfK Blue Moon as the font for a package design as part of a proposed law in Australia banning logos on cigarette packaging. The proposed law requires cigarettes to be sold in dark olive-brown packages that depict graphic images of the effects of smoking and the cigarette's brand printed in Lucida Sans. According to Tom Delaney, a senior designer with New York design consultant Muts & Joy, "Lucida Sans is one of the least graceful sans-serif typefaces designed. It’s clumsy in its line construction." On August 15, 2012, the Australian government approved the ban on cigarette logos, effectively replacing them with the unattractive packaging.

== See also ==
- MathTime
- Wingdings
