= Cory Synhorst SerVaas =

American inventor and doctor (1924–2020)

- Born: Cory Synhorst; June 21, 1924; Outside of Pella, Iowa, US
- Died: March 6, 2020 (aged 95); Indianapolis, Indiana, US
- Occupations: Editor, inventor, and doctor

Cory Synhorst SerVaas (June 21, 1924 – March 6, 2020) was an American editor, inventor, and doctor. She edited the Lionel train magazine and The Saturday Evening Post. Her work included hosting a weekly health show, advocating for health issues, translating medical terminology, and using mobile health screeners.

== Personal life ==
SerVaas was born on June 21, 1924, outside of Pella, Iowa, to John Dirk and Gertrude Roorda Synhorst. She had two siblings. She began elementary school when she was 4 years old at West Amsterdam and graduated high school when she was 15 years old. Had she graduated high school at an older age, SerVaas would have gone into a teaching career soon after. She began attending Central College in Pella in 1940 and she graduated in 1942. During her time at Central College, she was a gymnast. SerVaas took a journalism course at the University of Iowa after graduating from Central College in 1946, later completing graduate work in New York City at Columbia University. During this time, she was a seamstress. She met Beurt SerVaas after attending church on a Sunday, when the minister introduced them to each other. On January 8, 1950, they were married and moved to Indianapolis, Indiana. She received a medical degree in 1969 at the Indiana University School of Medicine. SerVaas died in Indianapolis on March 6, 2020, at 95 years old.

== Career ==
SerVaas edited the Lionel train magazine and her husband helped her patent the Cory Jane Clamp-on Apron, which she invented when she was a seamstress. The apron was manufactured by the Clamp-On Corporation to be sold in stores and could be adapted to multiple waist sizes in order keep aprons from moving. After Buert purchased The Saturday Evening Post in 1970, SerVaas was the editor-in-chief. SerVaas translated medical terminology into easy explanations and wrote two columns, Medical Mailbox and Ask Cory, as part of the magazine's staff.

SerVaas was the founder of the Benjamin Franklin Literary and Medical Society, the Saturday Evening Post Society, and the Children's Better Health Institute in 1976. In 1980, Servaas was elected to the University Iowa Hall of Fame for journalism. She traveled to Des Moines, Iowa, in January 1985 to share her thoughts on high-lysine corn having the ability to help end hunger in Africa, to end famine, and stop protein deficiency. A scientist from Purdue University created high-lysine corn 20 years prior, but the corn was only fed to livestock and poultry for the animals to gain weight fast. The corn was not grown often and had low yields. She was a host of a weekly health show on the Christian Broadcasting Network, in which she was an advocate for preventive healthcare and other health topics.

During the 1980s, SerVaas used mobile units which could find heart diseases and cancers. President Ronald Reagan made her part of the President's Commission on the HIV Epidemic in 1987, and George H. W. Bush had her as part of the President's Council on Physical Fitness and Sport in 1990. SerVaas created the Tulip Time Scholarship Games in 1993, which gave students the opportunity to win scholarships for competing athletically and academically. She worked on the Central College Advisory Board and National Advisory Council.
