= John Dreyfus =

British book designer and historian (1918–2002)

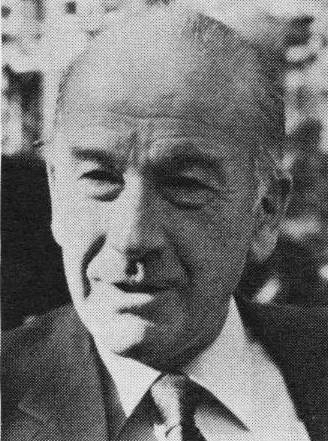
- Dreyfus circa 1984
- Born: 15 April 1918; London, United Kingdom
- Died: 29 December 2002 (aged 84); London, United Kingdom
- Education: Trinity College, Cambridge

John G. Dreyfus (15 April 1918 – 29 December 2002) was a British book designer and historian of printing who worked for Cambridge University Press and the Monotype printing company. He was also president of the ATypI trade association. Into Print is an anthology of his collected writings.

Dreyfus was educated at Oundle School and Trinity College, Cambridge (BA 1939, MA 1945).

Dreyfus received the Gutenberg Prize of the City of Mainz in 1996.
