= Edna Beilenson =

American typographer and fine press printer

Edna Rudolph Beilenson
- Born: Edna Rudolph; June 16, 1909; New York, New York
- Died: February 28, 1981 (aged 71); New York, New York
- Known for: Typography, fine printing, typesetting
- Notable work: Book Making on the Distaff Side
- Spouses: Peter Beilenson (m. 1930; his death 1962); Joseph E. Barmack (m. 1966; div. 1975)
- Awards: Woman of the Year in Business (Marquis's Who's Who), 1968; Goudy Award (RIT), 1980
- Elected: President, American Institute of Graphic Arts, 1958–60; Fellow, Royal Society of Arts; Hunter College Alumnae Hall of Fame, 1973

Edna Rudolph Beilenson (June 16, 1909 – February 28, 1981) was an American typographer, fine press printer, typesetter, book designer, cook book author, publisher, and co-proprietor (with her husband, Peter Beilenson) of the Peter Pauper Press from 1931 until his death in 1962, and afterward its sole proprietor and president until her death in 1981.

== Early life ==
Edna Rudolph was born June 16, 1909, in New York City, the daughter of the artist John and Anna (Beilenson) Rudolph. She graduated cum laude with a degree in journalism from Hunter College in 1928. In 1930, Rudolph married her cousin, Peter Beilenson, who had founded the Peter Pauper Press in 1928.

== Career ==
In 1932, Edna Beilenson joined in the business of press work at the Peter Pauper Press, learning bookkeeping and typesetting. She is credited with bringing a strong sense of graphic design and color to the press's productions, which became the hallmarks of Peter Pauper publications. The Press aimed "to print books as beautifully as a craftsman might, and sell them as cheaply as only a pauper could". Beilenson developed a keen business sense, introducing the concept of pocket-sized gift books, and edited a series of small cookbooks that sold extremely well.

== The Distaff Side ==
Beilenson led a group of women active in the production of fine press books, from various forms of illustration to bookbinding, punch cutting, typesetting, and graphic design, possibly as a women's response to the typophiles organization, which did not admit women. Their first formal production was a feminist work entitled Bookmaking on the Distaff Side, published in 1937. They were joined by two male luminaries of the private press world, Bruce Rogers, who wrote the introduction, and Frederic W. Goudy, who wrote a remembrance of his wife, Bertha M. Goudy, who had died in 1936. Beilenson, Jane Grabhorn, Gertrude Stein, Wanda Gág, and others contributed essays, histories, images, and other works of satire and commentary about women's overlooked roles in the production of books; each signature of the book was printed by a different woman printer. For example, Beilenson's essay, "Men in Printing", was printed at the Peter Pauper Press, while Anne Lyon Haight's satire, "Are Women the Natural Enemies of Books?" was printed at the Powgen Press.

Beilenson's introduction to a 1950 Distaff Side publication, A Children's Sampler, clearly illuminates the group's mission:

"The Distaff Side is a loosely-knit organization ... of women; and its membership has been enlisted from printing-offices, publishing houses, studios and other hiding-places where may be found devotees of the graphic arts.... [It] was born out of a righteous indignation that sufficient recognition had never been accorded to woman's place in the history of printing. To amend this deficiency, The Distaff Side published its first book, titled Bookmaking on the Distaff Side, which disclosed the monumental contributions which spinsters, wives, and widows have made to the graphic arts."

Under Beilenson's leadership, members of the same group later formed the Distaff Press which published several other titles on the subject of women's printing history.

== Professional achievements and awards ==
Beilenson became an active member of the American Institute of Graphic Arts (AIGA) and other professional book and graphic arts organizations. She was elected AIGA's first woman president, a post she held from 1958 to 1960. She was among the first women elected to the Grolier Club, a fellow of the Royal Society of Arts in London, and president and chairman of the Goudy Society. In 1968, Who's Who of American Women cited Beilenson as the year's outstanding woman in business. In 1973 she was elected to the Hunter College Alumnae Hall of Fame. In 1980, she received the Rochester Institute of Technology's Goudy Award for excellence in typography.

Edna Beilenson's role in the printing and publishing business was so fully integrated with her husband's that when Peter Beilenson died suddenly in 1962, she was able to take over the business and continue the press's operations successfully until her own death on February 28, 1981. Since 1981, the Beilenson family has continued to operate the Peter Pauper Press as a family business.

== Selected works ==
Edna Beilenson.Simple French Cookery (Mount Vernon, New York: Peter Pauper Press, 1958). Cover design by Ruth McCrea.

- Book Making on the Distaff Side. New York: Distaff Side, 1937.
- Beilenson, Edna, "Big Chief Type-Face". In A Garland for Goudy: Being Verses, Old and New, Gathered for his Eightieth Birthday, March Eighth, 1945. Mount Vernon, NY: Peter Pauper Press, 1945.
- Beilenson, Edna, "Experimentation and the Individual—A Psychological Approach". In Graphic Forms: The Arts As Related to the Book. Cambridge, Mass.: Harvard University Press, 1949.
- Beilenson, Edna, ed. A Children's Sampler: Selections from Famous Children's Books, Printed with Care & Solicitude. New York: Distaff Side, 1950.
- Simple Cookery series. Peter Pauper Press.
- ABCs of... Cookery series. Peter Pauper Press.
- Beilenson, Edna, and Herb Roth. Cooking to Kill!: The Poison Cook-Book, Comic Recipes for the Ghoul, Cannibal, Witch & Murderer. Mount Vernon, N.Y: Peter Pauper Press, 1951.
- Beilenson, Edna. Abalone to Zabaglione: Unusual and Exotic Recipes. Mt. Vernon, N.Y: Peter Pauper Press, 1957
