= Robert Frank Leslie =

English historian

Robert Frank Leslie (fl. 1918–2002) was professor of history at Queen Mary University of London. His papers are held by Queen Mary Archives. He was a specialist in modern Polish history.

== Selected publications ==
- Polish Politics and the Revolution of November, 1830. Athlone Press, London, 1956. (new edition 1969)
- Reform and Insurrection in Russian Poland, 1856-1865. Athlone Press, London, 1963. (University of London Historical Studies No. 13)
- The Age of Transformation, 1789-1871. Blandford Press, London, 1964.
- The Polish Question: Poland's Place in Modern History. Historical Association, London, 1964.
- The History of Poland since 1863. Cambridge University Press, Cambridge, 1980. (Editor and contributor) ISBN 0521226457
