= Robert Leslie (photographer) =

British photographer

Robert Leslie is a photographer from London. He was the chief photographer for TED and the World Science Festival. One of his major works involved two road trips, one in 2009 and the other in 2011, across the Sun Belt, documenting what he saw and the changes that occurred between the two journeys.

== Life ==
Robert Leslie was born in England but he spent his teenage years in Canada. As an adult, he returned to the UK and currently lives in London.

== Work ==
Leslie was the chief photographer for TED and the World Science Festival between 2005 and 2012. He also had many smaller commissions for magazines and newspapers. Prior to photography, Leslie worked in music composition and sound engineering.

=== Major projects ===
In 2007 Leslie took photographs of photographers, and others, who attended the Lucie photography awards. This was the start of an ongoing project, called 1000 portraits, which resulted in over 8000 portraits being taken during 30 award ceremonies.

At the beginning of 2009, starting on the day of the first inauguration of Barack Obama, Leslie travelled across the Sun Belt, from Florida to California, taking photographs of the landscapes and people he encountered. He returned towards the end of 2011 to document the changes that had taken place over the intervening years. Photographs from these two trips formed an exhibition called Stormbelt, which was held at Toronto Imageworks Gallery in May 2012. A selection of photographs were published as a book, also titled Stormbelt, with essays by Edward Burtynsky and Cameron Sinclair.
