= Kris Holmes =

American graphic and type designer

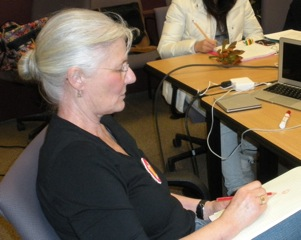
- Holmes in 2011
- Born: 1950 (age 75–76); Reedley, California
- Known for: Graphic design, Type design
- Awards: 2012 Goudy Award

Kris Holmes (born 1950, Reedley, California) is an American typeface designer, calligrapher, type design educator and animator. She, with Charles Bigelow, is the co-creator of the Lucida and Wingdings font families, among many other typeface designs. She is president and co-founder of Bigelow & Holmes Inc., a typeface design studio.

== Biography ==
=== Early life ===
Holmes grew up on a farm in Parlier, California. The nearest hospital was in Reedley, so she was born there. At Reed College in Portland, Oregon, Holmes studied calligraphy with Calligrapher Laureate of Oregon Lloyd J. Reynolds and modern dance with Judy Massee. In New York, she then continued her education by studying lettering with Ed Benguiat as well as modern dance at the Martha Graham and Alwin Nikolais schools. She later studied calligraphy and typeface design with Hermann Zapf at the Rochester Institute of Technology. She received a B.A. from Harvard University and an MFA from UCLA Film School in Animation.

=== Teaching ===
Holmes has taught at the Rochester Institute of Technology in both the Graphic Design and the Film Departments, Portland State University, the Museum Art School (Portland), Rhode Island School of Design, Santa Monica College, and the Otis College of Art and Design.

=== Design ===
By far the most well-known typeface design created by Bigelow & Holmes is Lucida. Bigelow and Holmes have written extensively about its original conception and subsequent evolution.

Notable projects include the design of Lucida Grande, at one time the system font for Apple Computer's OS X Operating System and the creation of the core fonts of the Java 2 language and developer kit for Sun Microsystems. These multilingual fonts cover five scripts, including Latin, Greek, Cyrillic, Hebrew and Arabic, and twelve styles, comprising 10,000 characters in all. Other computer platform clients include the Microsoft Corporation, Sun Microsystems’ Solaris division, and Lucent Technologies. Font designs include: Microsoft Wingdings (Windows 95 and 98), Lucida Console (Windows NT), TrueType Chicago, Monaco, Geneva, New York, Apple Chancery, Textile, Capitals (Macintosh OS), Lucida Unicode (Java, Solaris, and Lucent Inferno). Font designs have been additionally licensed by Adobe Systems, Agfa Corporation, ITC, Hewlett-Packard, Linotype Library, Monotype Typography, and the TeX Users Group. Lucida is also available from Bigelow & Holmes' own web site.

As the principal artist at Bigelow & Holmes, Holmes is responsible for the creation of over 100 digital typefaces, including conception, research, drawing, computer input, digital editing, and production management. Her illustrations have appeared in Scientific American, The Seybold Report, Computer Graphics, Fine Print and other publications. She has designed signage for Ghirardelli Square, San Francisco and Walter Lantz Studio, UCLA. Her work is included in the permanent collection of the Klingspor Museum, Germany and the Cary Graphic Arts Collection, Rochester Institute of Technology.

Kris Holmes received the 2012 RIT Frederic W. Goudy Award for excellence in typography and gave the keynote address at the 2012 RIT Reading Digital Symposium.

=== Film ===
Her screenplay, Vavilov, won a 2002 UCLA Sloan Foundation Student Film Award. She is the creator of the animated film La Bloomba, which was awarded a First Prize in the ChloroFilms 2009 contest. She has created many other animated films.

== Designed fonts ==
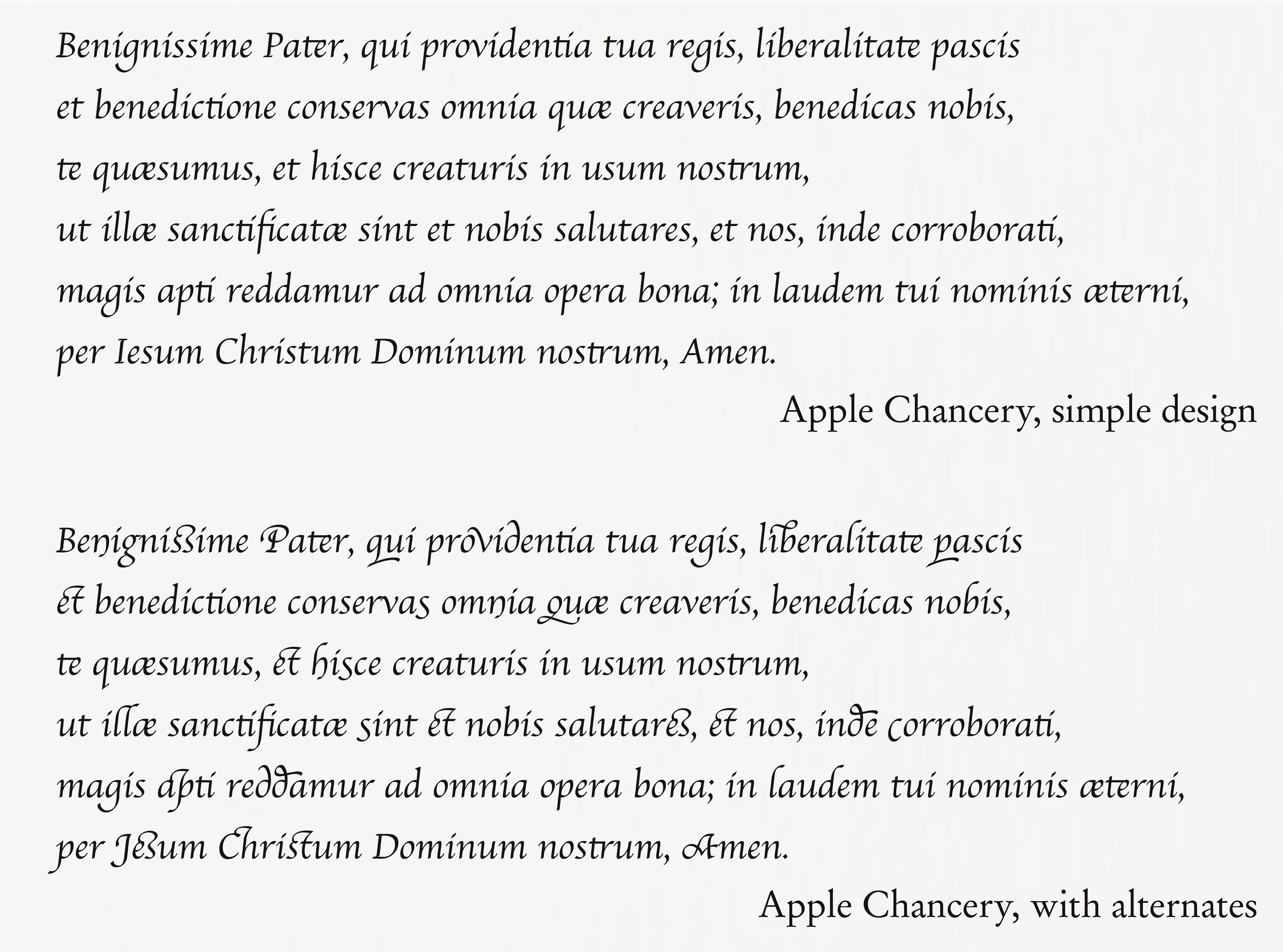
Apple Chancery by Holmes, commissioned by Apple in 1993. Holmes had been taught calligraphy at Reed College, by the same tutors as Steve Jobs (though not at the same time). The font's goal was to include complex alternates to somewhat mimic the verve of Renaissance scribes.

- Lucida Family: Lucida Grande, Lucida Sans, Lucida Console, Lucida Bright, Lucida Handwriting, Lucida Calligraphy, Lucida Casual (along with Charles Bigelow)
- For Apple, Inc:
  - New York
  - Monaco
  - Geneva
  - Chancery
  - Textile
- Kolibri
- Leviathan
- Isadora
- Go
- Wingdings (along with Charles Bigelow)

Samples of many of these typefaces are available online.
