= Luxi, Nancowry =

Luxi
- village
- Location in Andaman and Nicobar Islands, India Luxi (India)
- Coordinates: 8.223768°N 93.145636°E
- Country: India
- State: Andaman and Nicobar Islands
- District: Nicobar
- Tehsil: Nancowry

Population (2011)
  - Total: 149
- Time zone: UTC+5:30 (IST)
- Census code: 645037

Luxi is a village in the Nicobar district of Andaman and Nicobar Islands, India. It is located in the Nancowry tehsil.

== Demographics ==
According to the 2011 census of India, Luxi has 39 households. The effective literacy rate (i.e. the literacy rate of population excluding children aged 6 and below) is 67.21%.

Demographics (2011 Census)
	Total	Male	Female
Population	149	86	63
Children aged below 6 years	27	14	13
Scheduled caste	0	0	0
Scheduled tribe	142	81	61
Literates	82	55	27
Workers (all)	36	34	2
Main workers (total)	5	3	2
Main workers: Cultivators	0	0	0
Main workers: Agricultural labourers	1	1	0
Main workers: Household industry workers	0	0	0
Main workers: Other	4	2	2
Marginal workers (total)	31	31	0
Marginal workers: Cultivators	0	0	0
Marginal workers: Agricultural labourers	0	0	0
Marginal workers: Household industry workers	0	0	0
Marginal workers: Others	31	31	0
Non-workers	113	52	61
