= Peter Pauper Press =

American publishing company

- Status: Active
- Founded: 1928; 98 years ago
- Founder: Peter Beilenson
- Country of origin: United States
- Headquarters location: Rye Brook, New York
- Distribution: International
- Key people: Edna Beilenson
- Publication types: Books
- Official website: www.peterpauper.com

Peter Pauper Press is an American publishing company. Founded in 1928 by Peter Beilenson, the press was originally run with his wife, Edna, and focused on printing and publishing classic books. The press expanded into giftware and collector's items, and has continued to be run by multiple generations of the Beilenson family.

== History ==
=== 1928–1981: Under Peter and Edna Beilenson ===
Peter Beilenson started the press in 1928 in Larchmont, New York, in his parents' basement. The press's first two books were Faithless Sally Brown and Faithless Nellie Gray, written by Thomas Hood and illustrated by Herb Roth, and With Petrarch, a collection of poetry written by Petrarch and translated by John Millington Synge. With Petrarch was printed using a Pearl press, a type of foot treadle and hand-lever press. The American Institute of Graphic Arts (AIGA) chose the book to be on their list of the 50 best designed books from 1928. In 1929, Beilenson moved the press to New Rochelle, New York.

By the end of 1929, Beilenson and Edmund B. Thompson partnered up and started a printing shop in New Rochelle, called the Walpole Printing Office. Beilenson began the imprint "The Blue-Behinded Ape" that same year, to be used occasionally for works he deemed too “unrespectable” to be printed under the Peter Pauper name, including erotica.

In 1930, Beilenson married Edna and she became a partner at Peter Pauper Press. Other than working as a coproprieter, Edna also worked as the press's typesetter, bookbinder, proofreader, and bookkeeper. Peter spent the majority of his time printing for Walpole until 1932, when Thompson retired from the office. During this time, Edna continued typesetting for Peter Pauper Press in Peter's absence. Edna and Peter resumed the press as partners once he returned.

The press continued to print classic literature available within the public domain. In 1934, they began making two-dollar limited edition books. Needing more space, they moved their press to Mount Vernon, New York in 1935. The press began creating more collector's and gift items, including special editions of books and gift miniatures. In 1948, Edna started the press's line of one-dollar gift books. By the early 1950s, the press moved towards more commercial printing and lost the interest of book collectors.

Under Peter and Edna, the press was known for well-designed and inexpensive books, many of which included illustrations. The relative affordability of their books allowed fine press works to be accessed by the wider public. During their time, at least 304 titles were published, 46 appeared in AIGA's Fifty Books list, and 16 were included as part of the Limited Editions Club.

After Peter died in 1962, Edna took over as the sole proprietor of the publishing company. In 1978, she moved the press's offices to New York City. Around the time of their move, the Peter Pauper donated some of their equipment to State University of New York's Division of Visual Arts and their printing center. Edna died in 1981.

=== 1982 and onwards ===
After Edna's death, the press was taken over by the Beilenson's son, Nick, and his wife, Evelyn. In 1984, the press was moved to White Plains, New York, and began to be distributed by Kampmann and Company. Beginning in 1991, the press published miniature, novelty books. Through at least the early 2000s, they included bookmark charms on the majority of their small books.

In 2000, Laurence L. Beilenson took over as president of the company.
