= Charles Bigelow (type designer) =

American graphic and type designer

Charles A. Bigelow
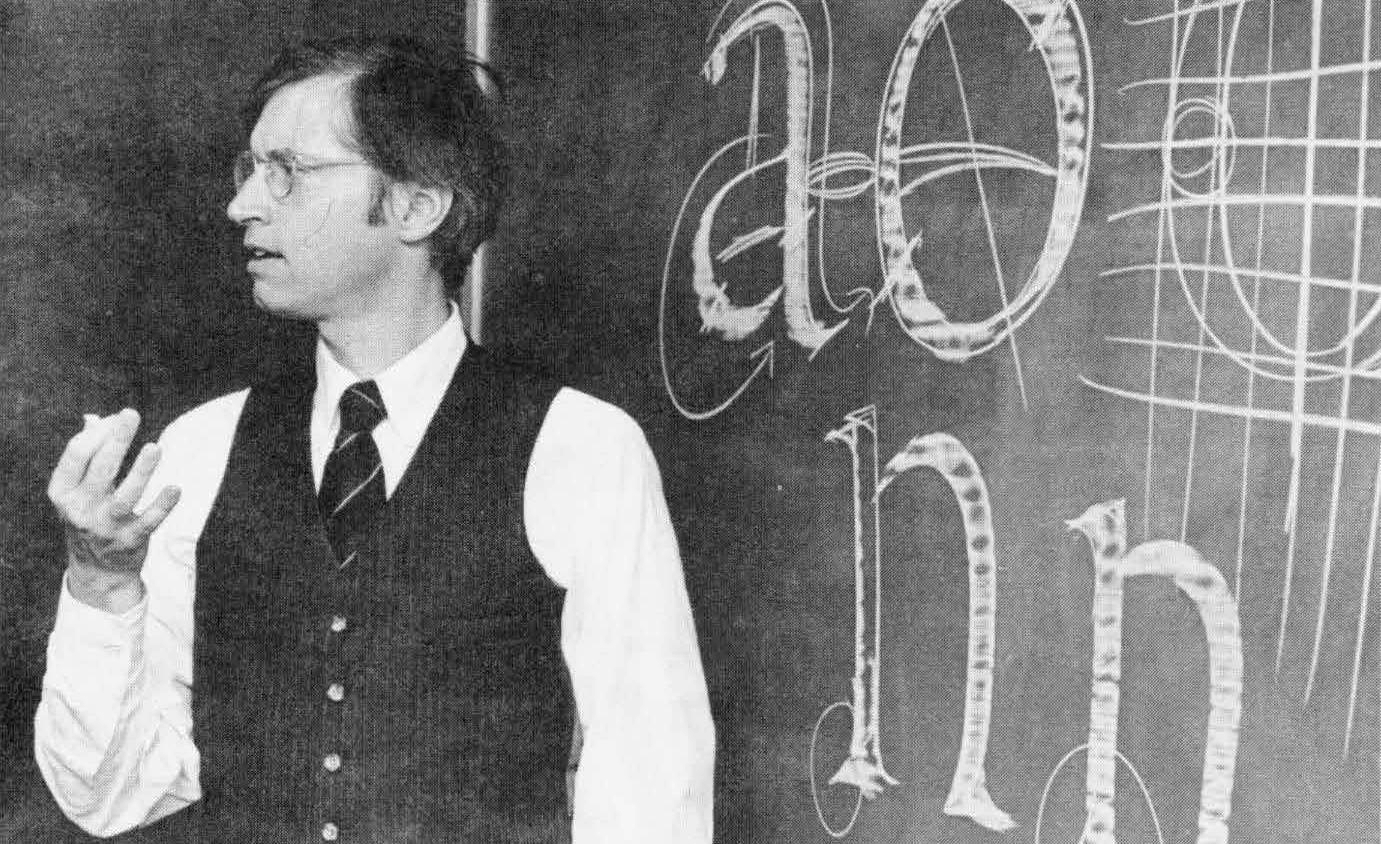
- Bigelow in 1987
- Born: July 29, 1945 (age 81); Detroit, Michigan, U.S.
- Education: Reed College (BA)
- Occupation: Type designer

Charles A. Bigelow (born July 29, 1945) is an American type historian, professor, and designer. Bigelow grew up in the Detroit suburbs and attended the Cranbrook School in Bloomfield Hills. He received a MacArthur Fellowship in 1982, the Frederic W. Goudy Award in 1987, Sloan Science and Film screenwriting awards in 2001 and 2002, and other honors. Along with Kris Holmes, he is the co-creator of Lucida and Wingdings font families. He is a principal of the Bigelow and Holmes studio.

Bigelow received a BA in anthropology in Reed College and was a professor of digital typography at Stanford University from 1982 to 1995. As president of the Committee on Letterform Research and Education of ATypI, he organized the first international seminar on digital type design: "The Computer and the Hand in Type Design", at Stanford in 1983.

In mid-2006, Bigelow was appointed to the Melbert B. Cary Distinguished Professorship at Rochester Institute of Technology. At RIT, he co-organized the 2010 international symposium on "The Future of Reading" and the 2012 "Reading Digital" symposium, in which type designers, publication designers, and vision scientists discussed the present and future of reading on digital devices. He retired from teaching at RIT in 2012, and was Cary Scholar in Residence at the Cary Graphic Arts Collection of the RIT Wallace Center.

== Designed fonts ==
- Leviathan
- Syntax Phonetic
- Lucida
- Lucida Grande
- Apple Chicago TrueType
- Apple Geneva TrueType
- Apple Monaco TrueType
- Apple New York TrueType
- Wingdings
- Go

== Publications ==
- The design of a Unicode font
- Notes on Apple 4 Fonts
- Notes on typeface protection, TUGboat 7:3, 1986
- Oh, oh, zero, TUGboat 34:2, 2013
- A letter on the persistence of ebooks, TUGboat 35:3, 2014
- About the DK versions of Lucida, TUGboat 36:3, 2015
- Digital Type Challenges, with Kris Holmes, Visible Language 59.1, 23-54, 2025.
