= Cary Graphic Arts Collection =

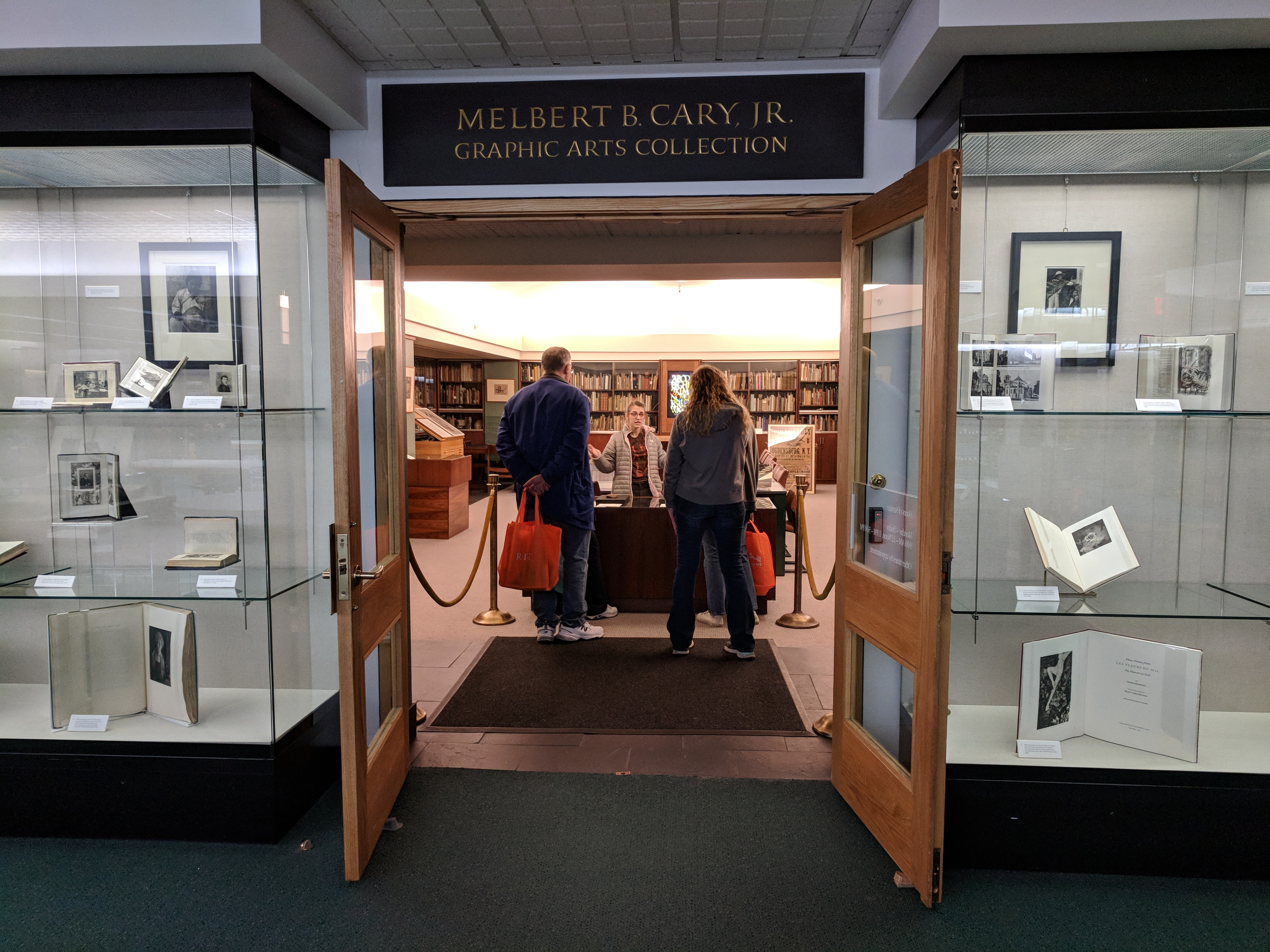
- Interactive map of Cary Graphic Arts Collection
- 43.08395°N 77.6761°W
- Location: 90 Lomb Memorial Drive; Rochester, NY 14623-5604, Henrietta, New York
- Established: 1969
- Affiliation: Rochester Institute of Technology
- Director: Steven K. Galbraith

Building information
- Building: Wallace Library
- Website: www.rit.edu/carycollection/

The Cary Graphic Arts Collection is a library and archive of books, type specimens, manuscripts, documents, and artifacts related to the history of graphical communication. Located in Wallace Library at the Rochester Institute of Technology (RIT), in Henrietta, New York, the Cary Collection contains literate artifacts as old as cuneiform tablets and as recent as computer tablets and e-books, in all comprising some 40,000 volumes in addition to manuscripts, correspondence, printing types and traditional letterpress printing equipment.

A recent, newsworthy acquisition is the Albion hand press from the Kelmscott Press of William Morris. The Cary Collection also possesses one of the rare copies (only 440 printed) of the extravagantly produced and illustrated Kelmscott Chaucer of 1896, which the British Library has called "a new benchmark for book design at the end of the 19th century". The Kelmscott Chaucer was hand printed on the Kelmscott Albion press which is also held in the Cary Collection.

== History of the Cary Collection ==
The original collection of 2,300 volumes was assembled during the 1920s and 1930s by Melbert B. Cary, Jr., director of Continental Type Founders Association, past president of the American Institute of Graphic Arts (AIGA), typophile, and proprietor of the private Press of the Woolly Whale. In 1969, the books that formed the nucleus of the Cary Graphic Arts Collection were presented to RIT by the Mary Flagler Cary Charitable Trust, as a memorial to Mr. Cary. The Charitable Trust also provided funds to support the use and growth of the Cary Collection, which has expanded almost 20-fold since its inception, and now includes materials related to the history of writing, the art of calligraphy, the formats and printing of early books, the design of typefaces, the technology of printing, the practice of paper-making, the art of the book and artists' books. The Cary Collection also includes works by recipients of RIT's Frederic W. Goudy Award for excellence of achievement in typography.

The Cary Collection has grown through several major donations. In 1982, the Cary Collection received the donation of The New York Times Museum of the Recorded Word, and in 1983 received the Bernard C. Middleton Collection of Books on Bookbinding. Recent gifts include the Jonathan and Patricia England Collection of American Fine Printing and the Ismar David archive, and an extensive collection, the most substantial in America, of manuscripts, layouts, calligraphy, and books by type and book designer Hermann Zapf. The Cary Collection also includes the Kubert Comics Lounge and Gallery, a space that features the artist Joe Kubert's drafting table, a collection of books from the artist's personal library, and rotating exhibits of comics and popular art.

The Curator of the Cary Collection from 1979 to 2011 was David Pankow, now RIT Librarian Emeritus. The Curator, since 2011, is Steven K. Galbraith. The Associate Curator is Amelia Hugill-Fontanel.

== The Cary Collection in education ==
The Cary Collection supports RIT undergraduate and graduate education in graphic design and graphic arts and is open to RIT students interested in researching any of its holdings. The Cary Collection also regularly hosts RIT classes for lectures and demonstrations, and welcomes visiting scholars.

The collection also presents public lectures and exhibitions on the art, history, and scholarship of the book. David Pankow, then Cary Curator, was a co-organizer of the June 2010 "Future of Reading" Symposium at RIT and the Cary Collection helped host the April 2012 RIT Symposium on "Reading Digital", organized by Charles Bigelow, then the Melbert B. Cary, Jr. Distinguished Professor of Graphic Arts at RIT.

== Highlights of the Cary Collection ==
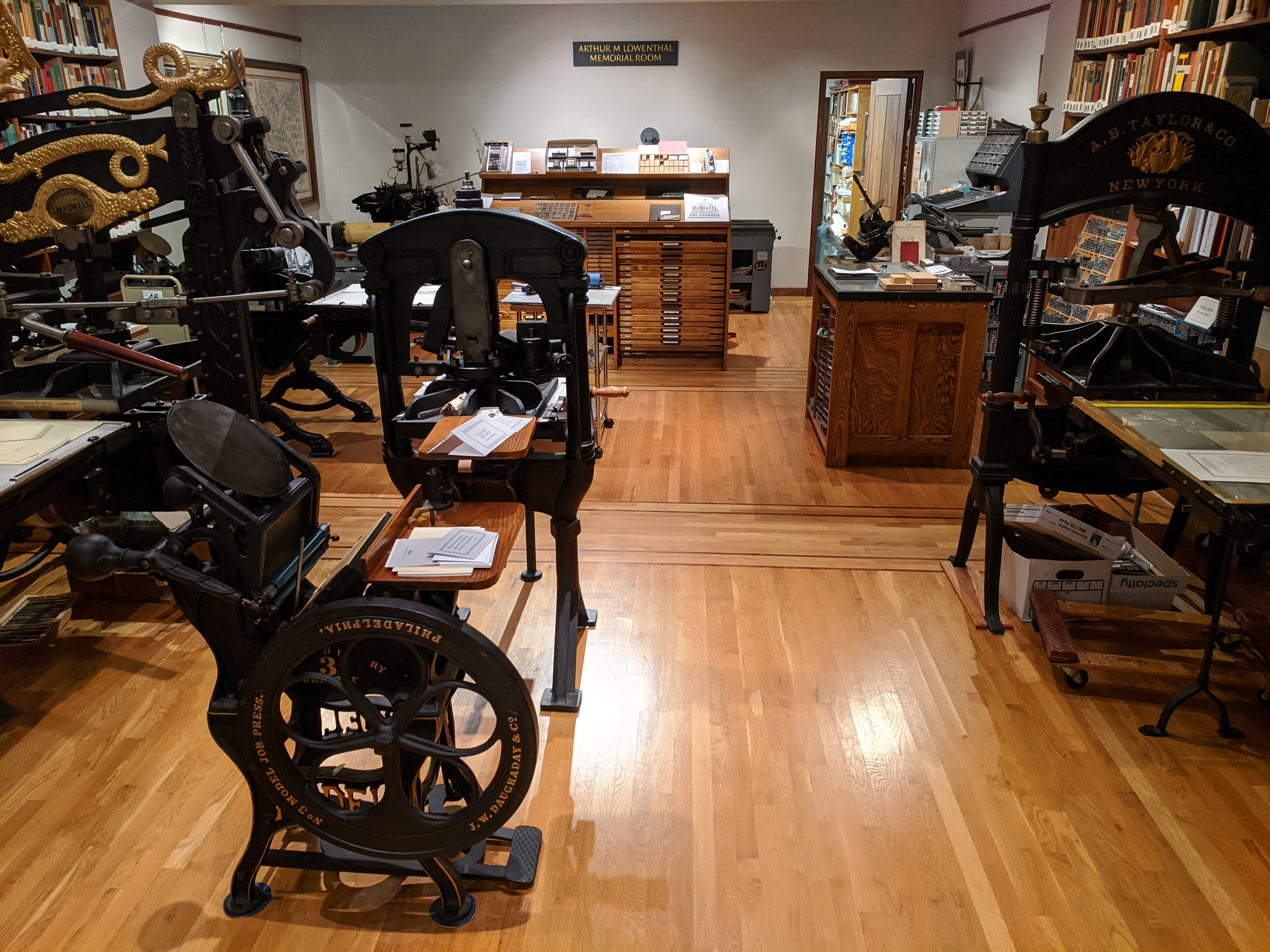
Arthur M. Lowenthal Memorial Room

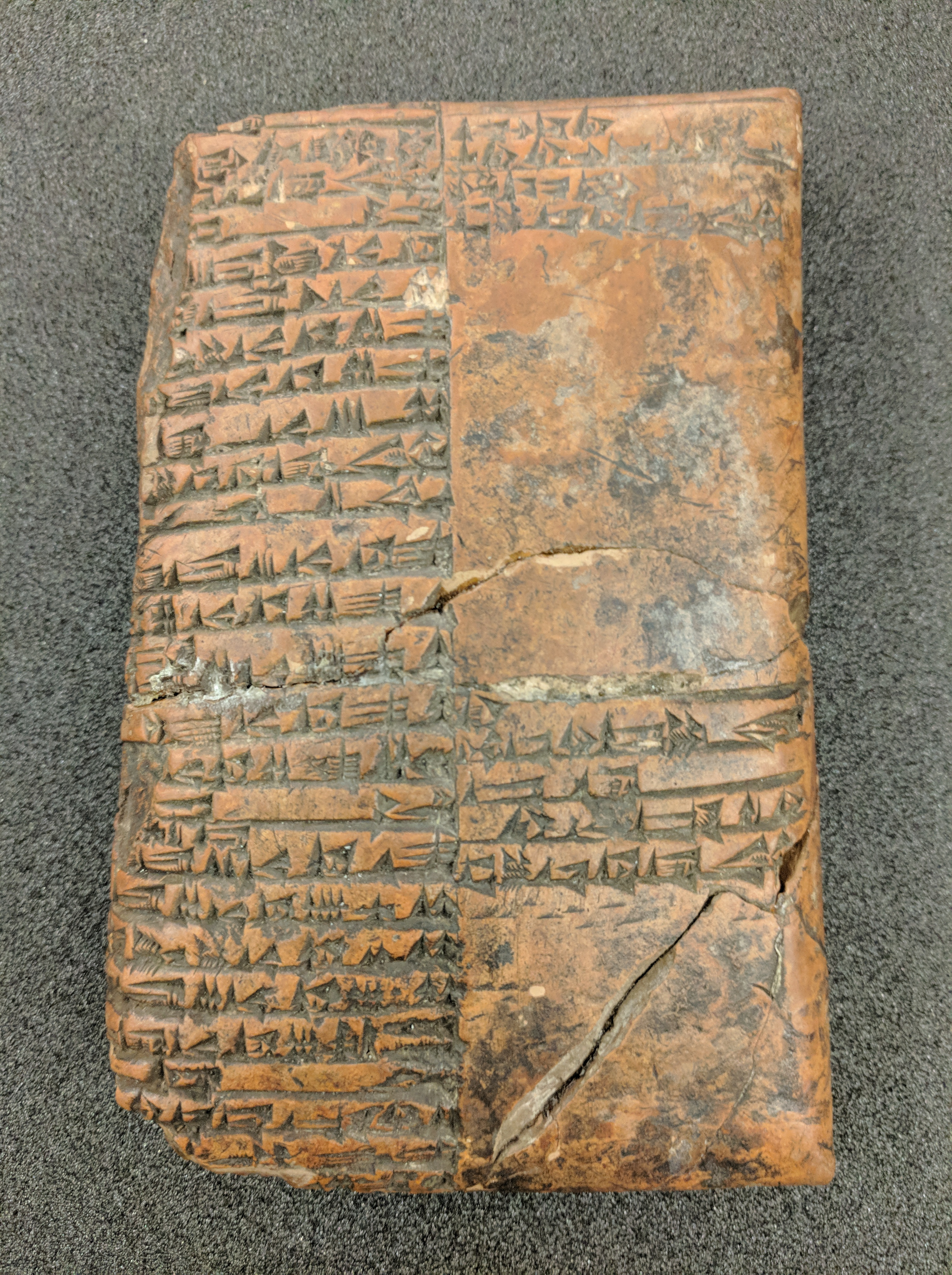
Cuneiform tablet

The Cary Collection contains incunabula (books from the "cradle" of printing, before 1501) including books printed by Johann Fust & Peter Schoeffer, Nicolas Jenson, Erhard Ratdolt, and Aldus Manutius, and books printed during the 16th century French "Golden Age" of typography include volumes from the presses of Simon de Colines and Henri Estienne.

The collection includes 18th century type specimens by William Caslon and Pierre-Simon Fournier, and books printed by John Baskerville in England and Benjamin Franklin in America. Among the collection's 19th century type specimens is the two volume Manuale Typographica of Giambattista Bodoni, and numerous other 19th specimens from American and European typefounders.

Harkening back to ancient materials shaped by modern hands, the collection includes alphabet stones carved by Edward Catich, based on early Roman inscriptions, as well as Catich's rubbings (similar to tracings) of the Trajan Inscription in Rome of 113 A.D.

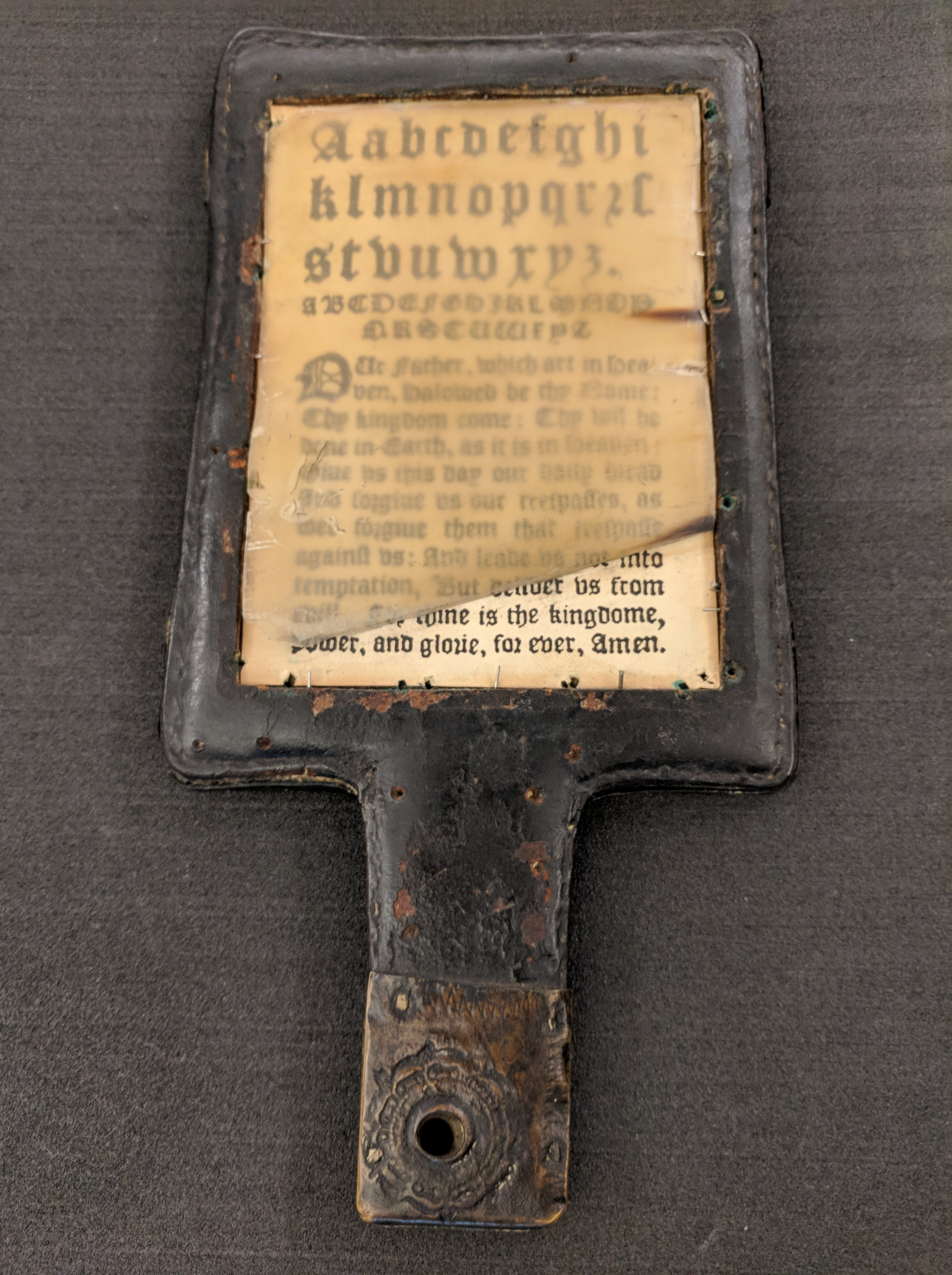
A 17th-Century English hornbook

Images of some of the collection's holdings can be found online in its Digital Collections.

== Publications ==
- Middleton, Bernard C. (2000). Highlights from the Bernard C. Middleton Collection of Books on Bookbinding | RIT Press | RIT. Rochester, NY: Melbert B. Cary, Jr. Graphic Arts Collection, Rochester Institute of Technology.
- Wall, David P.; Remington, R. Roger (2010). A Specimen Portfolio of Wood Type in the Cary Collection | RIT Press | RIT. Rochester, NY: RIT Cary Graphic Arts Press. ISBN 978-1-933360-44-7.
- Galbraith, Steven K. (2012). Edges of Books: Specimens of Edge Decoration from RIT Cary Graphic Arts Collection. Rochester, NY: RIT Cary Graphic Arts Press. ISBN 978-1-933360-69-0.
- Galbraith, Steven K.; Hugill-Fontanel, Amelia; Horowicz, Kari (2014). Highlights of the Cary Graphic Arts Collection at Rochester Institute of Technology | RIT Press | RIT. Rochester, NY: RIT Press. ISBN 9781939125132.
- Graphic Design Archives Chapbook Series: Lester Beall, Cipe Pineles, Will Burtin, Alvin Lustig, Elaine Lustig Cohen, and George Giusti. Rochester, NY: RIT Press. 2016. ISBN 978-1-939125-38-5.

== See also ==
- The Cary Collection of Playing Cards at the Beinecke Rare Book and Manuscript Library.
- The Mary Flagler Cary Music Collection at the Morgan Library & Museum.
